

343001–343100 

|-bgcolor=#d6d6d6
| 343001 ||  || — || January 21, 2009 || Bergisch Gladbach || W. Bickel || — || align=right | 3.6 km || 
|-id=002 bgcolor=#E9E9E9
| 343002 ||  || — || January 26, 2009 || Purple Mountain || PMO NEO || EUN || align=right | 2.0 km || 
|-id=003 bgcolor=#d6d6d6
| 343003 ||  || — || January 29, 2009 || Kachina || J. Hobart || — || align=right | 5.0 km || 
|-id=004 bgcolor=#d6d6d6
| 343004 ||  || — || January 29, 2009 || Dauban || F. Kugel || URS || align=right | 5.1 km || 
|-id=005 bgcolor=#d6d6d6
| 343005 ||  || — || January 30, 2009 || Taunus || S. Karge, R. Kling || — || align=right | 4.6 km || 
|-id=006 bgcolor=#d6d6d6
| 343006 ||  || — || October 21, 2001 || Kitt Peak || Spacewatch || — || align=right | 3.6 km || 
|-id=007 bgcolor=#d6d6d6
| 343007 ||  || — || January 25, 2009 || Kitt Peak || Spacewatch || — || align=right | 3.6 km || 
|-id=008 bgcolor=#d6d6d6
| 343008 ||  || — || January 25, 2009 || Kitt Peak || Spacewatch || — || align=right | 3.8 km || 
|-id=009 bgcolor=#d6d6d6
| 343009 ||  || — || January 25, 2009 || Kitt Peak || Spacewatch || — || align=right | 3.5 km || 
|-id=010 bgcolor=#d6d6d6
| 343010 ||  || — || January 25, 2009 || Kitt Peak || Spacewatch || — || align=right | 2.4 km || 
|-id=011 bgcolor=#d6d6d6
| 343011 ||  || — || January 25, 2009 || Kitt Peak || Spacewatch || EOS || align=right | 2.3 km || 
|-id=012 bgcolor=#d6d6d6
| 343012 ||  || — || January 25, 2009 || Kitt Peak || Spacewatch || THM || align=right | 2.4 km || 
|-id=013 bgcolor=#d6d6d6
| 343013 ||  || — || January 25, 2009 || Kitt Peak || Spacewatch || — || align=right | 2.2 km || 
|-id=014 bgcolor=#d6d6d6
| 343014 ||  || — || January 25, 2009 || Kitt Peak || Spacewatch || — || align=right | 3.7 km || 
|-id=015 bgcolor=#d6d6d6
| 343015 ||  || — || January 25, 2009 || Kitt Peak || Spacewatch || — || align=right | 3.0 km || 
|-id=016 bgcolor=#d6d6d6
| 343016 ||  || — || January 15, 2009 || Kitt Peak || Spacewatch || — || align=right | 3.9 km || 
|-id=017 bgcolor=#d6d6d6
| 343017 ||  || — || January 26, 2009 || Mount Lemmon || Mount Lemmon Survey || — || align=right | 2.0 km || 
|-id=018 bgcolor=#d6d6d6
| 343018 ||  || — || January 25, 2009 || Catalina || CSS || ALA || align=right | 5.7 km || 
|-id=019 bgcolor=#d6d6d6
| 343019 ||  || — || January 29, 2009 || Kitt Peak || Spacewatch || KOR || align=right | 1.4 km || 
|-id=020 bgcolor=#d6d6d6
| 343020 ||  || — || January 29, 2009 || Kitt Peak || Spacewatch || — || align=right | 2.5 km || 
|-id=021 bgcolor=#d6d6d6
| 343021 ||  || — || January 29, 2009 || Mount Lemmon || Mount Lemmon Survey || EOS || align=right | 1.9 km || 
|-id=022 bgcolor=#d6d6d6
| 343022 ||  || — || January 26, 2009 || Mount Lemmon || Mount Lemmon Survey || — || align=right | 2.1 km || 
|-id=023 bgcolor=#d6d6d6
| 343023 ||  || — || January 28, 2009 || Catalina || CSS || — || align=right | 4.7 km || 
|-id=024 bgcolor=#d6d6d6
| 343024 ||  || — || January 29, 2009 || Kitt Peak || Spacewatch || HYG || align=right | 3.2 km || 
|-id=025 bgcolor=#d6d6d6
| 343025 ||  || — || January 31, 2009 || Kitt Peak || Spacewatch || — || align=right | 5.5 km || 
|-id=026 bgcolor=#d6d6d6
| 343026 ||  || — || January 31, 2009 || Kitt Peak || Spacewatch || — || align=right | 3.4 km || 
|-id=027 bgcolor=#d6d6d6
| 343027 ||  || — || January 29, 2009 || Kitt Peak || Spacewatch || — || align=right | 3.3 km || 
|-id=028 bgcolor=#d6d6d6
| 343028 ||  || — || January 29, 2009 || Mount Lemmon || Mount Lemmon Survey || — || align=right | 3.5 km || 
|-id=029 bgcolor=#d6d6d6
| 343029 ||  || — || January 29, 2009 || Mount Lemmon || Mount Lemmon Survey || — || align=right | 3.6 km || 
|-id=030 bgcolor=#d6d6d6
| 343030 ||  || — || January 30, 2009 || Mount Lemmon || Mount Lemmon Survey || — || align=right | 4.5 km || 
|-id=031 bgcolor=#d6d6d6
| 343031 ||  || — || January 29, 2009 || Kitt Peak || Spacewatch || K-2 || align=right | 1.4 km || 
|-id=032 bgcolor=#d6d6d6
| 343032 ||  || — || January 29, 2009 || Kitt Peak || Spacewatch || — || align=right | 2.0 km || 
|-id=033 bgcolor=#d6d6d6
| 343033 ||  || — || January 29, 2009 || Kitt Peak || Spacewatch || — || align=right | 2.9 km || 
|-id=034 bgcolor=#d6d6d6
| 343034 ||  || — || January 29, 2009 || Kitt Peak || Spacewatch || CHA || align=right | 2.6 km || 
|-id=035 bgcolor=#d6d6d6
| 343035 ||  || — || January 29, 2009 || Kitt Peak || Spacewatch || — || align=right | 3.0 km || 
|-id=036 bgcolor=#E9E9E9
| 343036 ||  || — || January 30, 2009 || Kitt Peak || Spacewatch || — || align=right | 2.8 km || 
|-id=037 bgcolor=#d6d6d6
| 343037 ||  || — || January 30, 2009 || Kitt Peak || Spacewatch || — || align=right | 2.2 km || 
|-id=038 bgcolor=#d6d6d6
| 343038 ||  || — || January 30, 2009 || Kitt Peak || Spacewatch || — || align=right | 2.8 km || 
|-id=039 bgcolor=#d6d6d6
| 343039 ||  || — || January 30, 2009 || Mount Lemmon || Mount Lemmon Survey || HYG || align=right | 3.4 km || 
|-id=040 bgcolor=#d6d6d6
| 343040 ||  || — || January 30, 2009 || Mount Lemmon || Mount Lemmon Survey || EOS || align=right | 2.3 km || 
|-id=041 bgcolor=#d6d6d6
| 343041 ||  || — || January 31, 2009 || Kitt Peak || Spacewatch || — || align=right | 3.3 km || 
|-id=042 bgcolor=#d6d6d6
| 343042 ||  || — || October 31, 2007 || Kitt Peak || Spacewatch || THM || align=right | 2.5 km || 
|-id=043 bgcolor=#d6d6d6
| 343043 ||  || — || January 31, 2009 || Kitt Peak || Spacewatch || — || align=right | 1.9 km || 
|-id=044 bgcolor=#d6d6d6
| 343044 ||  || — || January 31, 2009 || Kitt Peak || Spacewatch || THM || align=right | 2.6 km || 
|-id=045 bgcolor=#d6d6d6
| 343045 ||  || — || January 31, 2009 || Mount Lemmon || Mount Lemmon Survey || — || align=right | 3.4 km || 
|-id=046 bgcolor=#d6d6d6
| 343046 ||  || — || January 30, 2009 || Mount Lemmon || Mount Lemmon Survey || VER || align=right | 4.2 km || 
|-id=047 bgcolor=#d6d6d6
| 343047 ||  || — || January 31, 2009 || Kitt Peak || Spacewatch || EOS || align=right | 1.8 km || 
|-id=048 bgcolor=#d6d6d6
| 343048 ||  || — || January 31, 2009 || Mount Lemmon || Mount Lemmon Survey || EOS || align=right | 2.1 km || 
|-id=049 bgcolor=#d6d6d6
| 343049 ||  || — || January 16, 2009 || Kitt Peak || Spacewatch || VER || align=right | 3.4 km || 
|-id=050 bgcolor=#d6d6d6
| 343050 ||  || — || January 31, 2009 || Mount Lemmon || Mount Lemmon Survey || — || align=right | 4.1 km || 
|-id=051 bgcolor=#d6d6d6
| 343051 ||  || — || January 31, 2009 || Kitt Peak || Spacewatch || — || align=right | 4.8 km || 
|-id=052 bgcolor=#d6d6d6
| 343052 ||  || — || January 20, 2009 || Mount Lemmon || Mount Lemmon Survey || — || align=right | 3.4 km || 
|-id=053 bgcolor=#d6d6d6
| 343053 ||  || — || January 18, 2009 || Mount Lemmon || Mount Lemmon Survey || — || align=right | 3.7 km || 
|-id=054 bgcolor=#d6d6d6
| 343054 ||  || — || January 29, 2009 || Mount Lemmon || Mount Lemmon Survey || — || align=right | 3.6 km || 
|-id=055 bgcolor=#d6d6d6
| 343055 ||  || — || February 1, 2009 || Kitt Peak || Spacewatch || — || align=right | 3.9 km || 
|-id=056 bgcolor=#d6d6d6
| 343056 ||  || — || February 1, 2009 || Kitt Peak || Spacewatch || — || align=right | 3.4 km || 
|-id=057 bgcolor=#d6d6d6
| 343057 Lucaravenni ||  ||  || February 15, 2009 || San Marcello || L. Tesi, G. Fagioli || — || align=right | 3.6 km || 
|-id=058 bgcolor=#d6d6d6
| 343058 ||  || — || February 1, 2009 || Kitt Peak || Spacewatch || VER || align=right | 3.2 km || 
|-id=059 bgcolor=#d6d6d6
| 343059 ||  || — || February 1, 2009 || Kitt Peak || Spacewatch || KOR || align=right | 1.3 km || 
|-id=060 bgcolor=#d6d6d6
| 343060 ||  || — || October 12, 2007 || Mount Lemmon || Mount Lemmon Survey || — || align=right | 2.7 km || 
|-id=061 bgcolor=#d6d6d6
| 343061 ||  || — || February 1, 2009 || Kitt Peak || Spacewatch || EOS || align=right | 2.2 km || 
|-id=062 bgcolor=#d6d6d6
| 343062 ||  || — || February 1, 2009 || Mount Lemmon || Mount Lemmon Survey || — || align=right | 4.0 km || 
|-id=063 bgcolor=#d6d6d6
| 343063 ||  || — || February 1, 2009 || Kitt Peak || Spacewatch || — || align=right | 4.6 km || 
|-id=064 bgcolor=#d6d6d6
| 343064 ||  || — || February 1, 2009 || Kitt Peak || Spacewatch || 628 || align=right | 2.1 km || 
|-id=065 bgcolor=#d6d6d6
| 343065 ||  || — || February 1, 2009 || Kitt Peak || Spacewatch || — || align=right | 3.7 km || 
|-id=066 bgcolor=#d6d6d6
| 343066 ||  || — || February 1, 2009 || Kitt Peak || Spacewatch || — || align=right | 3.8 km || 
|-id=067 bgcolor=#d6d6d6
| 343067 ||  || — || February 1, 2009 || Kitt Peak || Spacewatch || — || align=right | 2.3 km || 
|-id=068 bgcolor=#d6d6d6
| 343068 ||  || — || February 2, 2009 || Mount Lemmon || Mount Lemmon Survey || — || align=right | 4.4 km || 
|-id=069 bgcolor=#d6d6d6
| 343069 ||  || — || February 14, 2009 || Mount Lemmon || Mount Lemmon Survey || — || align=right | 6.5 km || 
|-id=070 bgcolor=#d6d6d6
| 343070 ||  || — || February 14, 2009 || Mount Lemmon || Mount Lemmon Survey || 3:2 || align=right | 7.9 km || 
|-id=071 bgcolor=#E9E9E9
| 343071 ||  || — || February 1, 2009 || Catalina || CSS || RAF || align=right | 1.3 km || 
|-id=072 bgcolor=#d6d6d6
| 343072 ||  || — || February 3, 2009 || Kitt Peak || Spacewatch || — || align=right | 2.5 km || 
|-id=073 bgcolor=#d6d6d6
| 343073 ||  || — || February 5, 2009 || Mount Lemmon || Mount Lemmon Survey || — || align=right | 4.0 km || 
|-id=074 bgcolor=#d6d6d6
| 343074 ||  || — || February 3, 2009 || Mount Lemmon || Mount Lemmon Survey || EOS || align=right | 2.1 km || 
|-id=075 bgcolor=#d6d6d6
| 343075 ||  || — || February 4, 2009 || Mount Lemmon || Mount Lemmon Survey || EOS || align=right | 1.8 km || 
|-id=076 bgcolor=#d6d6d6
| 343076 ||  || — || February 5, 2009 || Kitt Peak || Spacewatch || — || align=right | 3.1 km || 
|-id=077 bgcolor=#d6d6d6
| 343077 ||  || — || February 3, 2009 || Kitt Peak || Spacewatch || — || align=right | 3.5 km || 
|-id=078 bgcolor=#d6d6d6
| 343078 ||  || — || February 2, 2009 || Kitt Peak || Spacewatch || URS || align=right | 4.3 km || 
|-id=079 bgcolor=#d6d6d6
| 343079 ||  || — || February 3, 2009 || Mount Lemmon || Mount Lemmon Survey || — || align=right | 3.8 km || 
|-id=080 bgcolor=#d6d6d6
| 343080 ||  || — || February 17, 2009 || Heppenheim || Starkenburg Obs. || — || align=right | 2.5 km || 
|-id=081 bgcolor=#d6d6d6
| 343081 ||  || — || February 19, 2009 || Socorro || LINEAR || EUP || align=right | 4.4 km || 
|-id=082 bgcolor=#d6d6d6
| 343082 ||  || — || February 20, 2009 || Magdalena Ridge || W. H. Ryan || ELF || align=right | 4.5 km || 
|-id=083 bgcolor=#d6d6d6
| 343083 ||  || — || February 19, 2009 || Mount Lemmon || Mount Lemmon Survey || HYG || align=right | 3.0 km || 
|-id=084 bgcolor=#d6d6d6
| 343084 ||  || — || February 17, 2009 || Socorro || LINEAR || — || align=right | 2.7 km || 
|-id=085 bgcolor=#d6d6d6
| 343085 ||  || — || February 16, 2009 || Kitt Peak || Spacewatch || — || align=right | 3.4 km || 
|-id=086 bgcolor=#d6d6d6
| 343086 ||  || — || February 18, 2009 || La Sagra || OAM Obs. || — || align=right | 4.8 km || 
|-id=087 bgcolor=#d6d6d6
| 343087 ||  || — || February 17, 2009 || Kitt Peak || Spacewatch || — || align=right | 4.2 km || 
|-id=088 bgcolor=#d6d6d6
| 343088 ||  || — || February 17, 2009 || Kitt Peak || Spacewatch || — || align=right | 4.4 km || 
|-id=089 bgcolor=#E9E9E9
| 343089 ||  || — || February 19, 2009 || Mount Lemmon || Mount Lemmon Survey || — || align=right | 3.0 km || 
|-id=090 bgcolor=#d6d6d6
| 343090 ||  || — || February 21, 2009 || Catalina || CSS || — || align=right | 3.3 km || 
|-id=091 bgcolor=#d6d6d6
| 343091 ||  || — || February 19, 2009 || Kitt Peak || Spacewatch || — || align=right | 3.2 km || 
|-id=092 bgcolor=#d6d6d6
| 343092 ||  || — || February 20, 2009 || Kitt Peak || Spacewatch || — || align=right | 3.1 km || 
|-id=093 bgcolor=#d6d6d6
| 343093 ||  || — || February 20, 2009 || Kitt Peak || Spacewatch || — || align=right | 3.5 km || 
|-id=094 bgcolor=#d6d6d6
| 343094 ||  || — || February 23, 2009 || Calar Alto || F. Hormuth || HYG || align=right | 2.4 km || 
|-id=095 bgcolor=#d6d6d6
| 343095 ||  || — || February 16, 2009 || La Sagra || OAM Obs. || — || align=right | 5.0 km || 
|-id=096 bgcolor=#d6d6d6
| 343096 ||  || — || February 18, 2009 || La Sagra || OAM Obs. || HYG || align=right | 3.3 km || 
|-id=097 bgcolor=#d6d6d6
| 343097 ||  || — || February 18, 2009 || La Sagra || OAM Obs. || EOS || align=right | 2.6 km || 
|-id=098 bgcolor=#FFC2E0
| 343098 ||  || — || February 26, 2009 || Catalina || CSS || AMO || align=right data-sort-value="0.67" | 670 m || 
|-id=099 bgcolor=#d6d6d6
| 343099 ||  || — || February 25, 2009 || Dauban || F. Kugel || EUP || align=right | 5.0 km || 
|-id=100 bgcolor=#d6d6d6
| 343100 ||  || — || February 22, 2009 || Kitt Peak || Spacewatch || THM || align=right | 3.0 km || 
|}

343101–343200 

|-bgcolor=#d6d6d6
| 343101 ||  || — || February 22, 2009 || Kitt Peak || Spacewatch || SYL7:4 || align=right | 3.5 km || 
|-id=102 bgcolor=#d6d6d6
| 343102 ||  || — || February 22, 2009 || Kitt Peak || Spacewatch || — || align=right | 3.3 km || 
|-id=103 bgcolor=#d6d6d6
| 343103 ||  || — || February 22, 2009 || Kitt Peak || Spacewatch || — || align=right | 2.7 km || 
|-id=104 bgcolor=#d6d6d6
| 343104 ||  || — || February 19, 2009 || Kitt Peak || Spacewatch || — || align=right | 3.0 km || 
|-id=105 bgcolor=#E9E9E9
| 343105 ||  || — || February 20, 2009 || Mount Lemmon || Mount Lemmon Survey || — || align=right | 1.9 km || 
|-id=106 bgcolor=#d6d6d6
| 343106 ||  || — || February 26, 2009 || Catalina || CSS || — || align=right | 3.1 km || 
|-id=107 bgcolor=#d6d6d6
| 343107 ||  || — || February 19, 2009 || Kitt Peak || Spacewatch || — || align=right | 2.8 km || 
|-id=108 bgcolor=#d6d6d6
| 343108 ||  || — || February 26, 2009 || Kitt Peak || Spacewatch || VER || align=right | 3.2 km || 
|-id=109 bgcolor=#E9E9E9
| 343109 ||  || — || February 22, 2009 || Catalina || CSS || MAR || align=right | 1.7 km || 
|-id=110 bgcolor=#d6d6d6
| 343110 ||  || — || February 16, 2009 || Kitt Peak || Spacewatch || HYG || align=right | 3.2 km || 
|-id=111 bgcolor=#d6d6d6
| 343111 ||  || — || February 19, 2009 || Kitt Peak || Spacewatch || THM || align=right | 2.3 km || 
|-id=112 bgcolor=#E9E9E9
| 343112 ||  || — || February 20, 2009 || Kitt Peak || Spacewatch || — || align=right | 2.6 km || 
|-id=113 bgcolor=#d6d6d6
| 343113 ||  || — || February 21, 2009 || Kitt Peak || Spacewatch || — || align=right | 3.4 km || 
|-id=114 bgcolor=#d6d6d6
| 343114 ||  || — || February 26, 2009 || Kitt Peak || Spacewatch || — || align=right | 3.2 km || 
|-id=115 bgcolor=#d6d6d6
| 343115 ||  || — || February 21, 2009 || Kitt Peak || Spacewatch || — || align=right | 3.4 km || 
|-id=116 bgcolor=#d6d6d6
| 343116 ||  || — || February 26, 2009 || Catalina || CSS || — || align=right | 3.4 km || 
|-id=117 bgcolor=#d6d6d6
| 343117 ||  || — || February 28, 2009 || Kitt Peak || Spacewatch || THM || align=right | 3.2 km || 
|-id=118 bgcolor=#d6d6d6
| 343118 ||  || — || February 25, 2009 || Siding Spring || SSS || EUP || align=right | 4.8 km || 
|-id=119 bgcolor=#E9E9E9
| 343119 ||  || — || March 14, 2009 || La Sagra || OAM Obs. || — || align=right | 3.3 km || 
|-id=120 bgcolor=#d6d6d6
| 343120 ||  || — || March 15, 2009 || Kitt Peak || Spacewatch || — || align=right | 2.3 km || 
|-id=121 bgcolor=#d6d6d6
| 343121 ||  || — || March 15, 2009 || Catalina || CSS || HYG || align=right | 3.8 km || 
|-id=122 bgcolor=#d6d6d6
| 343122 ||  || — || March 15, 2009 || Kitt Peak || Spacewatch || — || align=right | 2.9 km || 
|-id=123 bgcolor=#d6d6d6
| 343123 ||  || — || March 15, 2009 || Kitt Peak || Spacewatch || EOS || align=right | 2.2 km || 
|-id=124 bgcolor=#d6d6d6
| 343124 ||  || — || March 15, 2009 || Kitt Peak || Spacewatch || — || align=right | 3.2 km || 
|-id=125 bgcolor=#d6d6d6
| 343125 ||  || — || March 15, 2009 || Kitt Peak || Spacewatch || — || align=right | 3.0 km || 
|-id=126 bgcolor=#d6d6d6
| 343126 ||  || — || March 15, 2009 || Mount Lemmon || Mount Lemmon Survey || — || align=right | 2.8 km || 
|-id=127 bgcolor=#d6d6d6
| 343127 ||  || — || March 15, 2009 || La Sagra || OAM Obs. || — || align=right | 4.1 km || 
|-id=128 bgcolor=#d6d6d6
| 343128 ||  || — || March 14, 2009 || La Sagra || OAM Obs. || LIX || align=right | 4.2 km || 
|-id=129 bgcolor=#d6d6d6
| 343129 ||  || — || March 4, 2009 || Siding Spring || SSS || 7:4 || align=right | 6.7 km || 
|-id=130 bgcolor=#d6d6d6
| 343130 ||  || — || March 7, 2009 || Mount Lemmon || Mount Lemmon Survey || — || align=right | 6.8 km || 
|-id=131 bgcolor=#d6d6d6
| 343131 ||  || — || March 6, 2009 || Siding Spring || SSS || — || align=right | 5.4 km || 
|-id=132 bgcolor=#d6d6d6
| 343132 ||  || — || March 16, 2009 || La Sagra || OAM Obs. || HYG || align=right | 4.0 km || 
|-id=133 bgcolor=#d6d6d6
| 343133 ||  || — || March 17, 2009 || Taunus || S. Karge, R. Kling || — || align=right | 4.0 km || 
|-id=134 bgcolor=#d6d6d6
| 343134 Bizet ||  ||  || March 19, 2009 || Saint-Sulpice || B. Christophe || — || align=right | 3.2 km || 
|-id=135 bgcolor=#d6d6d6
| 343135 ||  || — || March 16, 2009 || Dauban || F. Kugel || EOS || align=right | 2.6 km || 
|-id=136 bgcolor=#d6d6d6
| 343136 ||  || — || March 20, 2009 || La Sagra || OAM Obs. || — || align=right | 3.9 km || 
|-id=137 bgcolor=#d6d6d6
| 343137 ||  || — || March 22, 2009 || La Sagra || OAM Obs. || — || align=right | 3.8 km || 
|-id=138 bgcolor=#d6d6d6
| 343138 ||  || — || March 28, 2009 || Tzec Maun || E. Schwab || — || align=right | 3.4 km || 
|-id=139 bgcolor=#d6d6d6
| 343139 ||  || — || March 21, 2009 || Catalina || CSS || — || align=right | 4.6 km || 
|-id=140 bgcolor=#d6d6d6
| 343140 ||  || — || March 21, 2009 || Catalina || CSS || — || align=right | 4.2 km || 
|-id=141 bgcolor=#d6d6d6
| 343141 ||  || — || March 23, 2009 || Purple Mountain || PMO NEO || — || align=right | 3.3 km || 
|-id=142 bgcolor=#d6d6d6
| 343142 ||  || — || March 28, 2009 || Kitt Peak || Spacewatch || — || align=right | 2.7 km || 
|-id=143 bgcolor=#d6d6d6
| 343143 ||  || — || March 23, 2009 || Purple Mountain || PMO NEO || — || align=right | 4.5 km || 
|-id=144 bgcolor=#d6d6d6
| 343144 ||  || — || March 28, 2009 || Kitt Peak || Spacewatch || — || align=right | 3.9 km || 
|-id=145 bgcolor=#d6d6d6
| 343145 ||  || — || March 28, 2009 || Kitt Peak || Spacewatch || — || align=right | 4.0 km || 
|-id=146 bgcolor=#d6d6d6
| 343146 ||  || — || March 31, 2009 || Kitt Peak || Spacewatch || — || align=right | 2.5 km || 
|-id=147 bgcolor=#d6d6d6
| 343147 ||  || — || March 22, 2009 || Mount Lemmon || Mount Lemmon Survey || — || align=right | 3.2 km || 
|-id=148 bgcolor=#d6d6d6
| 343148 ||  || — || March 16, 2009 || Kitt Peak || Spacewatch || 7:4 || align=right | 5.3 km || 
|-id=149 bgcolor=#d6d6d6
| 343149 ||  || — || March 21, 2009 || Catalina || CSS || HYG || align=right | 3.1 km || 
|-id=150 bgcolor=#E9E9E9
| 343150 ||  || — || March 29, 2009 || Catalina || CSS || GAL || align=right | 1.9 km || 
|-id=151 bgcolor=#d6d6d6
| 343151 ||  || — || March 18, 2009 || Kitt Peak || Spacewatch || 7:4 || align=right | 4.1 km || 
|-id=152 bgcolor=#d6d6d6
| 343152 ||  || — || March 16, 2009 || Catalina || CSS || — || align=right | 3.9 km || 
|-id=153 bgcolor=#d6d6d6
| 343153 ||  || — || April 18, 2009 || Kitt Peak || Spacewatch || — || align=right | 4.2 km || 
|-id=154 bgcolor=#d6d6d6
| 343154 ||  || — || April 19, 2009 || Kitt Peak || Spacewatch || — || align=right | 3.6 km || 
|-id=155 bgcolor=#d6d6d6
| 343155 ||  || — || October 22, 2006 || Mount Lemmon || Mount Lemmon Survey || — || align=right | 3.3 km || 
|-id=156 bgcolor=#d6d6d6
| 343156 ||  || — || April 24, 2009 || Kitt Peak || Spacewatch || — || align=right | 2.6 km || 
|-id=157 bgcolor=#d6d6d6
| 343157 Mindaugas ||  ||  || April 25, 2009 || Baldone || K. Černis, I. Eglītis || — || align=right | 3.7 km || 
|-id=158 bgcolor=#FFC2E0
| 343158 Marsyas ||  ||  || April 29, 2009 || Catalina || CSS || APO +1kmdamocloid || align=right | 1.9 km || 
|-id=159 bgcolor=#C2FFFF
| 343159 ||  || — || May 13, 2009 || Kitt Peak || Spacewatch || L5 || align=right | 14 km || 
|-id=160 bgcolor=#d6d6d6
| 343160 ||  || — || May 19, 2009 || Dauban || F. Kugel || 3:2 || align=right | 6.2 km || 
|-id=161 bgcolor=#C2FFFF
| 343161 ||  || — || May 22, 2009 || Marly || P. Kocher || L5 || align=right | 11 km || 
|-id=162 bgcolor=#fefefe
| 343162 ||  || — || December 18, 2007 || Mount Lemmon || Mount Lemmon Survey || — || align=right data-sort-value="0.88" | 880 m || 
|-id=163 bgcolor=#fefefe
| 343163 ||  || — || August 16, 2009 || Catalina || CSS || H || align=right data-sort-value="0.71" | 710 m || 
|-id=164 bgcolor=#fefefe
| 343164 ||  || — || January 31, 2008 || Mount Lemmon || Mount Lemmon Survey || — || align=right data-sort-value="0.88" | 880 m || 
|-id=165 bgcolor=#fefefe
| 343165 ||  || — || September 25, 2009 || Catalina || CSS || H || align=right data-sort-value="0.79" | 790 m || 
|-id=166 bgcolor=#FFC2E0
| 343166 ||  || — || September 25, 2009 || Socorro || LINEAR || APO +1km || align=right data-sort-value="0.67" | 670 m || 
|-id=167 bgcolor=#fefefe
| 343167 ||  || — || September 18, 2009 || Kitt Peak || Spacewatch || — || align=right data-sort-value="0.85" | 850 m || 
|-id=168 bgcolor=#fefefe
| 343168 ||  || — || September 20, 2009 || Kitt Peak || Spacewatch || FLO || align=right data-sort-value="0.68" | 680 m || 
|-id=169 bgcolor=#fefefe
| 343169 ||  || — || September 22, 2009 || Kitt Peak || Spacewatch || FLO || align=right data-sort-value="0.60" | 600 m || 
|-id=170 bgcolor=#fefefe
| 343170 ||  || — || February 2, 2008 || Mount Lemmon || Mount Lemmon Survey || — || align=right data-sort-value="0.73" | 730 m || 
|-id=171 bgcolor=#fefefe
| 343171 ||  || — || September 23, 2009 || Kitt Peak || Spacewatch || — || align=right data-sort-value="0.60" | 600 m || 
|-id=172 bgcolor=#fefefe
| 343172 ||  || — || September 25, 2009 || Kitt Peak || Spacewatch || FLO || align=right data-sort-value="0.64" | 640 m || 
|-id=173 bgcolor=#fefefe
| 343173 ||  || — || September 30, 2009 || Mount Lemmon || Mount Lemmon Survey || FLO || align=right data-sort-value="0.67" | 670 m || 
|-id=174 bgcolor=#C2FFFF
| 343174 ||  || — || September 25, 2009 || Catalina || CSS || L4 || align=right | 17 km || 
|-id=175 bgcolor=#fefefe
| 343175 ||  || — || September 22, 2009 || Mount Lemmon || Mount Lemmon Survey || — || align=right data-sort-value="0.86" | 860 m || 
|-id=176 bgcolor=#fefefe
| 343176 ||  || — || September 30, 2009 || Mount Lemmon || Mount Lemmon Survey || — || align=right | 1.1 km || 
|-id=177 bgcolor=#fefefe
| 343177 ||  || — || October 14, 2009 || Catalina || CSS || — || align=right | 1.2 km || 
|-id=178 bgcolor=#fefefe
| 343178 ||  || — || October 14, 2009 || Catalina || CSS || — || align=right data-sort-value="0.90" | 900 m || 
|-id=179 bgcolor=#fefefe
| 343179 ||  || — || October 23, 2009 || Mount Lemmon || Mount Lemmon Survey || — || align=right data-sort-value="0.71" | 710 m || 
|-id=180 bgcolor=#fefefe
| 343180 ||  || — || October 22, 2009 || Catalina || CSS || — || align=right data-sort-value="0.78" | 780 m || 
|-id=181 bgcolor=#fefefe
| 343181 ||  || — || October 23, 2009 || Mount Lemmon || Mount Lemmon Survey || — || align=right data-sort-value="0.79" | 790 m || 
|-id=182 bgcolor=#fefefe
| 343182 ||  || — || October 23, 2009 || Mount Lemmon || Mount Lemmon Survey || FLO || align=right data-sort-value="0.52" | 520 m || 
|-id=183 bgcolor=#fefefe
| 343183 ||  || — || October 22, 2009 || Catalina || CSS || — || align=right data-sort-value="0.75" | 750 m || 
|-id=184 bgcolor=#fefefe
| 343184 ||  || — || October 22, 2009 || Mount Lemmon || Mount Lemmon Survey || FLO || align=right | 1.7 km || 
|-id=185 bgcolor=#fefefe
| 343185 ||  || — || October 24, 2009 || Catalina || CSS || — || align=right | 1.0 km || 
|-id=186 bgcolor=#fefefe
| 343186 ||  || — || October 23, 2009 || Kitt Peak || Spacewatch || V || align=right data-sort-value="0.67" | 670 m || 
|-id=187 bgcolor=#fefefe
| 343187 ||  || — || October 22, 2009 || Mount Lemmon || Mount Lemmon Survey || — || align=right data-sort-value="0.89" | 890 m || 
|-id=188 bgcolor=#fefefe
| 343188 ||  || — || October 24, 2009 || Catalina || CSS || — || align=right data-sort-value="0.98" | 980 m || 
|-id=189 bgcolor=#E9E9E9
| 343189 ||  || — || October 16, 2009 || Mount Lemmon || Mount Lemmon Survey || HOF || align=right | 2.2 km || 
|-id=190 bgcolor=#fefefe
| 343190 ||  || — || April 14, 2008 || Catalina || CSS || — || align=right data-sort-value="0.94" | 940 m || 
|-id=191 bgcolor=#fefefe
| 343191 ||  || — || October 26, 2009 || Mount Lemmon || Mount Lemmon Survey || V || align=right data-sort-value="0.78" | 780 m || 
|-id=192 bgcolor=#fefefe
| 343192 ||  || — || September 5, 1999 || Catalina || CSS || — || align=right data-sort-value="0.90" | 900 m || 
|-id=193 bgcolor=#fefefe
| 343193 ||  || — || October 24, 2009 || Kitt Peak || Spacewatch || — || align=right data-sort-value="0.72" | 720 m || 
|-id=194 bgcolor=#fefefe
| 343194 ||  || — || November 9, 2009 || Mount Lemmon || Mount Lemmon Survey || — || align=right | 1.3 km || 
|-id=195 bgcolor=#fefefe
| 343195 ||  || — || February 12, 2000 || Apache Point || SDSS || V || align=right data-sort-value="0.74" | 740 m || 
|-id=196 bgcolor=#fefefe
| 343196 ||  || — || November 10, 2009 || Mount Lemmon || Mount Lemmon Survey || FLO || align=right data-sort-value="0.67" | 670 m || 
|-id=197 bgcolor=#fefefe
| 343197 ||  || — || November 8, 2009 || Kitt Peak || Spacewatch || FLO || align=right data-sort-value="0.61" | 610 m || 
|-id=198 bgcolor=#fefefe
| 343198 ||  || — || November 8, 2009 || Catalina || CSS || FLO || align=right data-sort-value="0.66" | 660 m || 
|-id=199 bgcolor=#fefefe
| 343199 ||  || — || November 9, 2009 || Mount Lemmon || Mount Lemmon Survey || NYS || align=right data-sort-value="0.82" | 820 m || 
|-id=200 bgcolor=#fefefe
| 343200 ||  || — || November 11, 2009 || Kitt Peak || Spacewatch || V || align=right data-sort-value="0.57" | 570 m || 
|}

343201–343300 

|-bgcolor=#fefefe
| 343201 ||  || — || November 8, 2009 || Kitt Peak || Spacewatch || — || align=right | 1.1 km || 
|-id=202 bgcolor=#fefefe
| 343202 ||  || — || November 9, 2009 || Kitt Peak || Spacewatch || — || align=right data-sort-value="0.84" | 840 m || 
|-id=203 bgcolor=#fefefe
| 343203 ||  || — || November 11, 2009 || Kitt Peak || Spacewatch || — || align=right data-sort-value="0.71" | 710 m || 
|-id=204 bgcolor=#fefefe
| 343204 ||  || — || November 15, 2009 || Catalina || CSS || — || align=right data-sort-value="0.75" | 750 m || 
|-id=205 bgcolor=#fefefe
| 343205 ||  || — || January 10, 2007 || Kitt Peak || Spacewatch || FLO || align=right data-sort-value="0.61" | 610 m || 
|-id=206 bgcolor=#fefefe
| 343206 ||  || — || November 9, 2009 || Mount Lemmon || Mount Lemmon Survey || FLO || align=right data-sort-value="0.80" | 800 m || 
|-id=207 bgcolor=#fefefe
| 343207 ||  || — || November 15, 2009 || Catalina || CSS || — || align=right | 1.4 km || 
|-id=208 bgcolor=#fefefe
| 343208 ||  || — || November 8, 2009 || Mount Lemmon || Mount Lemmon Survey || — || align=right | 1.4 km || 
|-id=209 bgcolor=#fefefe
| 343209 ||  || — || November 11, 2009 || Mount Lemmon || Mount Lemmon Survey || — || align=right data-sort-value="0.72" | 720 m || 
|-id=210 bgcolor=#fefefe
| 343210 ||  || — || November 18, 2009 || Mayhill || A. Lowe || — || align=right data-sort-value="0.66" | 660 m || 
|-id=211 bgcolor=#fefefe
| 343211 ||  || — || November 17, 2009 || Catalina || CSS || NYS || align=right | 1.6 km || 
|-id=212 bgcolor=#fefefe
| 343212 ||  || — || November 16, 2009 || Kitt Peak || Spacewatch || FLO || align=right data-sort-value="0.73" | 730 m || 
|-id=213 bgcolor=#fefefe
| 343213 ||  || — || November 16, 2009 || Kitt Peak || Spacewatch || FLO || align=right data-sort-value="0.62" | 620 m || 
|-id=214 bgcolor=#d6d6d6
| 343214 ||  || — || November 8, 2009 || Kitt Peak || Spacewatch || — || align=right | 3.8 km || 
|-id=215 bgcolor=#fefefe
| 343215 ||  || — || November 17, 2009 || Kitt Peak || Spacewatch || — || align=right data-sort-value="0.98" | 980 m || 
|-id=216 bgcolor=#fefefe
| 343216 ||  || — || November 17, 2009 || Kitt Peak || Spacewatch || — || align=right data-sort-value="0.79" | 790 m || 
|-id=217 bgcolor=#fefefe
| 343217 ||  || — || November 17, 2009 || Kitt Peak || Spacewatch || — || align=right data-sort-value="0.86" | 860 m || 
|-id=218 bgcolor=#fefefe
| 343218 ||  || — || November 17, 2009 || Kitt Peak || Spacewatch || FLO || align=right data-sort-value="0.73" | 730 m || 
|-id=219 bgcolor=#fefefe
| 343219 ||  || — || November 17, 2009 || Mount Lemmon || Mount Lemmon Survey || — || align=right | 1.2 km || 
|-id=220 bgcolor=#fefefe
| 343220 ||  || — || November 18, 2009 || Kitt Peak || Spacewatch || — || align=right data-sort-value="0.74" | 740 m || 
|-id=221 bgcolor=#fefefe
| 343221 ||  || — || November 18, 2009 || Kitt Peak || Spacewatch || — || align=right data-sort-value="0.73" | 730 m || 
|-id=222 bgcolor=#fefefe
| 343222 ||  || — || November 18, 2009 || Kitt Peak || Spacewatch || — || align=right data-sort-value="0.94" | 940 m || 
|-id=223 bgcolor=#FA8072
| 343223 ||  || — || November 19, 2009 || Kitt Peak || Spacewatch || — || align=right | 1.0 km || 
|-id=224 bgcolor=#fefefe
| 343224 ||  || — || November 19, 2009 || Kitt Peak || Spacewatch || — || align=right data-sort-value="0.82" | 820 m || 
|-id=225 bgcolor=#FA8072
| 343225 ||  || — || November 19, 2009 || Kitt Peak || Spacewatch || — || align=right data-sort-value="0.97" | 970 m || 
|-id=226 bgcolor=#fefefe
| 343226 ||  || — || November 19, 2009 || Kitt Peak || Spacewatch || — || align=right | 1.1 km || 
|-id=227 bgcolor=#fefefe
| 343227 ||  || — || November 19, 2009 || Kitt Peak || Spacewatch || — || align=right data-sort-value="0.82" | 820 m || 
|-id=228 bgcolor=#fefefe
| 343228 ||  || — || November 19, 2009 || Kitt Peak || Spacewatch || FLO || align=right data-sort-value="0.62" | 620 m || 
|-id=229 bgcolor=#d6d6d6
| 343229 ||  || — || November 19, 2009 || Kitt Peak || Spacewatch || — || align=right | 2.3 km || 
|-id=230 bgcolor=#fefefe
| 343230 Corsini ||  ||  || November 22, 2009 || Magasa || M. Tonincelli, F. Zanardini || — || align=right | 1.1 km || 
|-id=231 bgcolor=#fefefe
| 343231 ||  || — || November 19, 2006 || Kitt Peak || Spacewatch || — || align=right data-sort-value="0.72" | 720 m || 
|-id=232 bgcolor=#fefefe
| 343232 ||  || — || November 20, 2009 || Kitt Peak || Spacewatch || — || align=right data-sort-value="0.73" | 730 m || 
|-id=233 bgcolor=#fefefe
| 343233 ||  || — || November 20, 2009 || Kitt Peak || Spacewatch || — || align=right | 1.7 km || 
|-id=234 bgcolor=#fefefe
| 343234 ||  || — || November 20, 2009 || Mount Lemmon || Mount Lemmon Survey || — || align=right data-sort-value="0.70" | 700 m || 
|-id=235 bgcolor=#fefefe
| 343235 ||  || — || November 20, 2009 || Mount Lemmon || Mount Lemmon Survey || NYS || align=right data-sort-value="0.72" | 720 m || 
|-id=236 bgcolor=#fefefe
| 343236 ||  || — || September 19, 2009 || Mount Lemmon || Mount Lemmon Survey || — || align=right data-sort-value="0.81" | 810 m || 
|-id=237 bgcolor=#fefefe
| 343237 ||  || — || November 23, 2009 || Mount Lemmon || Mount Lemmon Survey || — || align=right data-sort-value="0.82" | 820 m || 
|-id=238 bgcolor=#fefefe
| 343238 ||  || — || November 21, 2009 || Kitt Peak || Spacewatch || — || align=right data-sort-value="0.86" | 860 m || 
|-id=239 bgcolor=#fefefe
| 343239 ||  || — || November 16, 2009 || Mount Lemmon || Mount Lemmon Survey || — || align=right data-sort-value="0.93" | 930 m || 
|-id=240 bgcolor=#fefefe
| 343240 ||  || — || November 24, 2009 || Kitt Peak || Spacewatch || — || align=right data-sort-value="0.75" | 750 m || 
|-id=241 bgcolor=#fefefe
| 343241 ||  || — || November 24, 2009 || Mount Lemmon || Mount Lemmon Survey || — || align=right data-sort-value="0.90" | 900 m || 
|-id=242 bgcolor=#fefefe
| 343242 ||  || — || November 25, 2009 || Kitt Peak || Spacewatch || FLO || align=right data-sort-value="0.55" | 550 m || 
|-id=243 bgcolor=#fefefe
| 343243 ||  || — || November 26, 2009 || Mount Lemmon || Mount Lemmon Survey || — || align=right data-sort-value="0.68" | 680 m || 
|-id=244 bgcolor=#fefefe
| 343244 ||  || — || November 17, 2009 || Kitt Peak || Spacewatch || — || align=right data-sort-value="0.73" | 730 m || 
|-id=245 bgcolor=#fefefe
| 343245 ||  || — || September 22, 2009 || Mount Lemmon || Mount Lemmon Survey || — || align=right data-sort-value="0.82" | 820 m || 
|-id=246 bgcolor=#fefefe
| 343246 ||  || — || November 16, 2009 || Kitt Peak || Spacewatch || FLO || align=right data-sort-value="0.78" | 780 m || 
|-id=247 bgcolor=#fefefe
| 343247 ||  || — || November 18, 2009 || Kitt Peak || Spacewatch || — || align=right data-sort-value="0.70" | 700 m || 
|-id=248 bgcolor=#fefefe
| 343248 ||  || — || November 17, 2009 || Kitt Peak || Spacewatch || NYS || align=right data-sort-value="0.77" | 770 m || 
|-id=249 bgcolor=#fefefe
| 343249 ||  || — || December 13, 2009 || Hibiscus || N. Teamo || — || align=right | 1.2 km || 
|-id=250 bgcolor=#fefefe
| 343250 ||  || — || October 1, 2005 || Mount Lemmon || Mount Lemmon Survey || V || align=right data-sort-value="0.73" | 730 m || 
|-id=251 bgcolor=#fefefe
| 343251 ||  || — || December 12, 2009 || Tzec Maun || Tzec Maun Obs. || FLO || align=right data-sort-value="0.64" | 640 m || 
|-id=252 bgcolor=#fefefe
| 343252 ||  || — || December 15, 2009 || Mount Lemmon || Mount Lemmon Survey || — || align=right data-sort-value="0.71" | 710 m || 
|-id=253 bgcolor=#fefefe
| 343253 ||  || — || November 16, 2009 || Mount Lemmon || Mount Lemmon Survey || — || align=right | 1.6 km || 
|-id=254 bgcolor=#fefefe
| 343254 ||  || — || December 15, 2009 || Mount Lemmon || Mount Lemmon Survey || MAS || align=right data-sort-value="0.78" | 780 m || 
|-id=255 bgcolor=#fefefe
| 343255 ||  || — || December 10, 2009 || Mount Lemmon || Mount Lemmon Survey || V || align=right data-sort-value="0.80" | 800 m || 
|-id=256 bgcolor=#fefefe
| 343256 ||  || — || December 15, 2009 || Mount Lemmon || Mount Lemmon Survey || — || align=right data-sort-value="0.60" | 600 m || 
|-id=257 bgcolor=#E9E9E9
| 343257 ||  || — || December 15, 2009 || Mount Lemmon || Mount Lemmon Survey || — || align=right | 1.2 km || 
|-id=258 bgcolor=#E9E9E9
| 343258 ||  || — || December 13, 2009 || Socorro || LINEAR || — || align=right | 1.9 km || 
|-id=259 bgcolor=#E9E9E9
| 343259 ||  || — || December 17, 2009 || Mount Lemmon || Mount Lemmon Survey || — || align=right | 3.1 km || 
|-id=260 bgcolor=#E9E9E9
| 343260 ||  || — || December 18, 2009 || Mount Lemmon || Mount Lemmon Survey || — || align=right | 2.5 km || 
|-id=261 bgcolor=#fefefe
| 343261 ||  || — || November 8, 2009 || Kitt Peak || Spacewatch || — || align=right data-sort-value="0.98" | 980 m || 
|-id=262 bgcolor=#fefefe
| 343262 ||  || — || December 26, 2009 || Kitt Peak || Spacewatch || — || align=right | 1.2 km || 
|-id=263 bgcolor=#E9E9E9
| 343263 ||  || — || December 28, 2009 || Purple Mountain || PMO NEO || — || align=right | 1.9 km || 
|-id=264 bgcolor=#fefefe
| 343264 ||  || — || December 26, 2009 || Kitt Peak || Spacewatch || — || align=right | 4.1 km || 
|-id=265 bgcolor=#fefefe
| 343265 ||  || — || December 19, 2009 || Mount Lemmon || Mount Lemmon Survey || V || align=right data-sort-value="0.73" | 730 m || 
|-id=266 bgcolor=#fefefe
| 343266 ||  || — || December 17, 2009 || Mount Lemmon || Mount Lemmon Survey || V || align=right data-sort-value="0.71" | 710 m || 
|-id=267 bgcolor=#fefefe
| 343267 ||  || — || December 18, 2009 || Kitt Peak || Spacewatch || — || align=right data-sort-value="0.68" | 680 m || 
|-id=268 bgcolor=#E9E9E9
| 343268 ||  || — || December 19, 2009 || Mount Lemmon || Mount Lemmon Survey || MAR || align=right | 1.2 km || 
|-id=269 bgcolor=#E9E9E9
| 343269 ||  || — || December 20, 2009 || Mount Lemmon || Mount Lemmon Survey || — || align=right | 2.8 km || 
|-id=270 bgcolor=#fefefe
| 343270 ||  || — || January 5, 2010 || Kitt Peak || Spacewatch || MAS || align=right data-sort-value="0.76" | 760 m || 
|-id=271 bgcolor=#fefefe
| 343271 ||  || — || January 6, 2010 || Jarnac || Jarnac Obs. || ERI || align=right | 1.5 km || 
|-id=272 bgcolor=#fefefe
| 343272 ||  || — || January 6, 2010 || Catalina || CSS || NYS || align=right data-sort-value="0.71" | 710 m || 
|-id=273 bgcolor=#fefefe
| 343273 ||  || — || October 3, 2005 || Catalina || CSS || — || align=right data-sort-value="0.82" | 820 m || 
|-id=274 bgcolor=#fefefe
| 343274 ||  || — || January 7, 2010 || Mount Lemmon || Mount Lemmon Survey || — || align=right | 1.1 km || 
|-id=275 bgcolor=#E9E9E9
| 343275 ||  || — || January 6, 2010 || Kitt Peak || Spacewatch || ADE || align=right | 3.0 km || 
|-id=276 bgcolor=#d6d6d6
| 343276 ||  || — || January 6, 2010 || Kitt Peak || Spacewatch || URS || align=right | 6.2 km || 
|-id=277 bgcolor=#fefefe
| 343277 ||  || — || January 6, 2010 || Kitt Peak || Spacewatch || — || align=right data-sort-value="0.97" | 970 m || 
|-id=278 bgcolor=#d6d6d6
| 343278 ||  || — || January 7, 2010 || Kitt Peak || Spacewatch || — || align=right | 4.0 km || 
|-id=279 bgcolor=#fefefe
| 343279 ||  || — || January 7, 2010 || Kitt Peak || Spacewatch || — || align=right data-sort-value="0.89" | 890 m || 
|-id=280 bgcolor=#E9E9E9
| 343280 ||  || — || October 7, 2008 || Mount Lemmon || Mount Lemmon Survey || — || align=right | 1.9 km || 
|-id=281 bgcolor=#fefefe
| 343281 ||  || — || January 7, 2010 || Kitt Peak || Spacewatch || NYS || align=right data-sort-value="0.85" | 850 m || 
|-id=282 bgcolor=#fefefe
| 343282 ||  || — || January 5, 2010 || Kitt Peak || Spacewatch || — || align=right | 2.3 km || 
|-id=283 bgcolor=#fefefe
| 343283 ||  || — || January 6, 2010 || Catalina || CSS || FLO || align=right | 1.4 km || 
|-id=284 bgcolor=#E9E9E9
| 343284 ||  || — || January 6, 2010 || Mount Lemmon || Mount Lemmon Survey || — || align=right | 2.1 km || 
|-id=285 bgcolor=#fefefe
| 343285 ||  || — || January 6, 2010 || Kitt Peak || Spacewatch || NYS || align=right data-sort-value="0.83" | 830 m || 
|-id=286 bgcolor=#d6d6d6
| 343286 ||  || — || January 6, 2010 || Kitt Peak || Spacewatch || TIR || align=right | 3.1 km || 
|-id=287 bgcolor=#E9E9E9
| 343287 ||  || — || January 7, 2010 || Mount Lemmon || Mount Lemmon Survey || KON || align=right | 3.0 km || 
|-id=288 bgcolor=#fefefe
| 343288 ||  || — || January 8, 2010 || Kitt Peak || Spacewatch || NYS || align=right | 2.1 km || 
|-id=289 bgcolor=#fefefe
| 343289 ||  || — || January 8, 2010 || Mount Lemmon || Mount Lemmon Survey || — || align=right data-sort-value="0.72" | 720 m || 
|-id=290 bgcolor=#E9E9E9
| 343290 ||  || — || January 8, 2010 || Kitt Peak || Spacewatch || — || align=right | 1.8 km || 
|-id=291 bgcolor=#fefefe
| 343291 ||  || — || November 20, 2006 || Mount Lemmon || Mount Lemmon Survey || V || align=right data-sort-value="0.84" | 840 m || 
|-id=292 bgcolor=#fefefe
| 343292 ||  || — || January 12, 2010 || Kitt Peak || Spacewatch || — || align=right data-sort-value="0.86" | 860 m || 
|-id=293 bgcolor=#fefefe
| 343293 ||  || — || January 12, 2010 || Kitt Peak || Spacewatch || — || align=right | 1.5 km || 
|-id=294 bgcolor=#fefefe
| 343294 ||  || — || January 12, 2010 || Kitt Peak || Spacewatch || KLI || align=right | 1.9 km || 
|-id=295 bgcolor=#fefefe
| 343295 ||  || — || September 29, 2001 || Palomar || NEAT || — || align=right | 1.2 km || 
|-id=296 bgcolor=#fefefe
| 343296 ||  || — || September 24, 1995 || Kitt Peak || Spacewatch || — || align=right data-sort-value="0.89" | 890 m || 
|-id=297 bgcolor=#fefefe
| 343297 ||  || — || January 14, 2010 || Kitt Peak || Spacewatch || — || align=right data-sort-value="0.90" | 900 m || 
|-id=298 bgcolor=#fefefe
| 343298 ||  || — || January 12, 2010 || Catalina || CSS || V || align=right | 1.0 km || 
|-id=299 bgcolor=#fefefe
| 343299 ||  || — || January 7, 2010 || Mount Lemmon || Mount Lemmon Survey || V || align=right | 1.1 km || 
|-id=300 bgcolor=#E9E9E9
| 343300 ||  || — || January 8, 2010 || Kitt Peak || Spacewatch || ADE || align=right | 2.1 km || 
|}

343301–343400 

|-bgcolor=#d6d6d6
| 343301 ||  || — || January 8, 2010 || WISE || WISE || — || align=right | 5.1 km || 
|-id=302 bgcolor=#E9E9E9
| 343302 ||  || — || January 8, 2010 || WISE || WISE || HOF || align=right | 3.5 km || 
|-id=303 bgcolor=#d6d6d6
| 343303 ||  || — || January 9, 2010 || WISE || WISE || — || align=right | 3.8 km || 
|-id=304 bgcolor=#E9E9E9
| 343304 ||  || — || November 7, 2008 || Mount Lemmon || Mount Lemmon Survey || — || align=right | 2.5 km || 
|-id=305 bgcolor=#d6d6d6
| 343305 ||  || — || January 13, 2010 || WISE || WISE || — || align=right | 4.5 km || 
|-id=306 bgcolor=#d6d6d6
| 343306 ||  || — || January 13, 2010 || WISE || WISE || — || align=right | 4.9 km || 
|-id=307 bgcolor=#d6d6d6
| 343307 ||  || — || January 14, 2010 || WISE || WISE || — || align=right | 5.6 km || 
|-id=308 bgcolor=#fefefe
| 343308 ||  || — || January 16, 2010 || Nyukasa || Mount Nyukasa Stn. || — || align=right | 1.6 km || 
|-id=309 bgcolor=#fefefe
| 343309 ||  || — || January 21, 2010 || Bisei SG Center || BATTeRS || — || align=right data-sort-value="0.77" | 770 m || 
|-id=310 bgcolor=#E9E9E9
| 343310 ||  || — || January 23, 2010 || Bisei SG Center || BATTeRS || — || align=right | 3.5 km || 
|-id=311 bgcolor=#fefefe
| 343311 ||  || — || January 17, 2010 || Kitt Peak || Spacewatch || MAS || align=right data-sort-value="0.95" | 950 m || 
|-id=312 bgcolor=#E9E9E9
| 343312 ||  || — || January 18, 2010 || WISE || WISE || — || align=right | 4.5 km || 
|-id=313 bgcolor=#d6d6d6
| 343313 ||  || — || January 19, 2010 || WISE || WISE || EMA || align=right | 3.9 km || 
|-id=314 bgcolor=#d6d6d6
| 343314 ||  || — || January 21, 2010 || WISE || WISE || URS || align=right | 5.2 km || 
|-id=315 bgcolor=#d6d6d6
| 343315 ||  || — || January 21, 2010 || WISE || WISE || — || align=right | 4.2 km || 
|-id=316 bgcolor=#d6d6d6
| 343316 ||  || — || January 22, 2010 || WISE || WISE || — || align=right | 4.1 km || 
|-id=317 bgcolor=#d6d6d6
| 343317 ||  || — || January 23, 2010 || WISE || WISE || — || align=right | 5.3 km || 
|-id=318 bgcolor=#d6d6d6
| 343318 ||  || — || January 23, 2010 || WISE || WISE || MRC || align=right | 3.8 km || 
|-id=319 bgcolor=#E9E9E9
| 343319 ||  || — || January 24, 2010 || WISE || WISE || HOF || align=right | 2.9 km || 
|-id=320 bgcolor=#d6d6d6
| 343320 ||  || — || May 19, 2005 || Mount Lemmon || Mount Lemmon Survey || 7:4 || align=right | 5.5 km || 
|-id=321 bgcolor=#fefefe
| 343321 ||  || — || March 16, 2004 || Socorro || LINEAR || — || align=right | 2.0 km || 
|-id=322 bgcolor=#E9E9E9
| 343322 Tomskuniver || 2010 CK ||  || February 6, 2010 || Zelenchukskaya || T. V. Kryachko || — || align=right | 3.2 km || 
|-id=323 bgcolor=#fefefe
| 343323 ||  || — || February 8, 2010 || Tzec Maun || E. Schwab || V || align=right data-sort-value="0.78" | 780 m || 
|-id=324 bgcolor=#fefefe
| 343324 ||  || — || February 5, 2010 || Kitt Peak || Spacewatch || — || align=right data-sort-value="0.91" | 910 m || 
|-id=325 bgcolor=#fefefe
| 343325 ||  || — || February 5, 2010 || Kitt Peak || Spacewatch || NYS || align=right data-sort-value="0.81" | 810 m || 
|-id=326 bgcolor=#d6d6d6
| 343326 ||  || — || January 18, 2009 || Kitt Peak || Spacewatch || — || align=right | 5.9 km || 
|-id=327 bgcolor=#E9E9E9
| 343327 ||  || — || February 7, 2010 || WISE || WISE || — || align=right | 2.3 km || 
|-id=328 bgcolor=#E9E9E9
| 343328 ||  || — || February 8, 2010 || WISE || WISE || — || align=right | 3.8 km || 
|-id=329 bgcolor=#d6d6d6
| 343329 ||  || — || February 10, 2010 || WISE || WISE || — || align=right | 5.2 km || 
|-id=330 bgcolor=#E9E9E9
| 343330 ||  || — || February 11, 2010 || WISE || WISE || — || align=right | 1.9 km || 
|-id=331 bgcolor=#fefefe
| 343331 ||  || — || December 30, 2005 || Mount Lemmon || Mount Lemmon Survey || — || align=right | 1.2 km || 
|-id=332 bgcolor=#E9E9E9
| 343332 ||  || — || February 9, 2010 || Kitt Peak || Spacewatch || — || align=right | 1.6 km || 
|-id=333 bgcolor=#E9E9E9
| 343333 ||  || — || February 9, 2010 || Kitt Peak || Spacewatch || — || align=right | 1.1 km || 
|-id=334 bgcolor=#E9E9E9
| 343334 ||  || — || February 9, 2010 || Kitt Peak || Spacewatch || — || align=right | 2.3 km || 
|-id=335 bgcolor=#d6d6d6
| 343335 ||  || — || February 9, 2010 || Kitt Peak || Spacewatch || — || align=right | 5.5 km || 
|-id=336 bgcolor=#fefefe
| 343336 ||  || — || February 10, 2010 || Kitt Peak || Spacewatch || — || align=right | 1.1 km || 
|-id=337 bgcolor=#d6d6d6
| 343337 ||  || — || February 10, 2010 || Kitt Peak || Spacewatch || — || align=right | 3.7 km || 
|-id=338 bgcolor=#E9E9E9
| 343338 ||  || — || February 10, 2010 || Kitt Peak || Spacewatch || — || align=right | 2.2 km || 
|-id=339 bgcolor=#fefefe
| 343339 ||  || — || February 13, 2010 || Kitt Peak || Spacewatch || NYS || align=right data-sort-value="0.66" | 660 m || 
|-id=340 bgcolor=#fefefe
| 343340 ||  || — || February 5, 2010 || Catalina || CSS || NYS || align=right data-sort-value="0.85" | 850 m || 
|-id=341 bgcolor=#fefefe
| 343341 ||  || — || February 6, 2010 || Mount Lemmon || Mount Lemmon Survey || — || align=right | 2.2 km || 
|-id=342 bgcolor=#fefefe
| 343342 ||  || — || February 6, 2010 || Mount Lemmon || Mount Lemmon Survey || MAS || align=right data-sort-value="0.86" | 860 m || 
|-id=343 bgcolor=#d6d6d6
| 343343 ||  || — || February 12, 2010 || WISE || WISE || — || align=right | 4.0 km || 
|-id=344 bgcolor=#fefefe
| 343344 ||  || — || November 1, 1997 || Kitt Peak || Spacewatch || — || align=right | 1.1 km || 
|-id=345 bgcolor=#E9E9E9
| 343345 ||  || — || January 28, 2006 || Catalina || CSS || — || align=right | 3.6 km || 
|-id=346 bgcolor=#d6d6d6
| 343346 ||  || — || February 14, 2010 || Socorro || LINEAR || — || align=right | 2.6 km || 
|-id=347 bgcolor=#E9E9E9
| 343347 ||  || — || February 14, 2010 || Socorro || LINEAR || EUN || align=right | 1.4 km || 
|-id=348 bgcolor=#E9E9E9
| 343348 ||  || — || February 14, 2010 || Socorro || LINEAR || HNS || align=right | 1.6 km || 
|-id=349 bgcolor=#E9E9E9
| 343349 ||  || — || February 14, 2010 || Socorro || LINEAR || KON || align=right | 3.1 km || 
|-id=350 bgcolor=#fefefe
| 343350 ||  || — || February 14, 2010 || Socorro || LINEAR || — || align=right | 1.1 km || 
|-id=351 bgcolor=#d6d6d6
| 343351 ||  || — || February 9, 2010 || Kitt Peak || Spacewatch || — || align=right | 3.6 km || 
|-id=352 bgcolor=#d6d6d6
| 343352 ||  || — || February 9, 2010 || Kitt Peak || Spacewatch || — || align=right | 3.3 km || 
|-id=353 bgcolor=#fefefe
| 343353 ||  || — || February 9, 2010 || Kitt Peak || Spacewatch || MAS || align=right data-sort-value="0.82" | 820 m || 
|-id=354 bgcolor=#E9E9E9
| 343354 ||  || — || February 10, 2010 || Kitt Peak || Spacewatch || — || align=right | 2.9 km || 
|-id=355 bgcolor=#E9E9E9
| 343355 ||  || — || February 10, 2010 || Kitt Peak || Spacewatch || — || align=right | 2.5 km || 
|-id=356 bgcolor=#E9E9E9
| 343356 ||  || — || February 24, 2006 || Mount Lemmon || Mount Lemmon Survey || — || align=right | 1.6 km || 
|-id=357 bgcolor=#E9E9E9
| 343357 ||  || — || February 13, 2010 || Mount Lemmon || Mount Lemmon Survey || — || align=right | 1.3 km || 
|-id=358 bgcolor=#E9E9E9
| 343358 ||  || — || February 13, 2010 || Mount Lemmon || Mount Lemmon Survey || — || align=right | 1.4 km || 
|-id=359 bgcolor=#fefefe
| 343359 ||  || — || January 5, 2006 || Catalina || CSS || — || align=right data-sort-value="0.96" | 960 m || 
|-id=360 bgcolor=#d6d6d6
| 343360 ||  || — || February 13, 2010 || Mount Lemmon || Mount Lemmon Survey || — || align=right | 5.0 km || 
|-id=361 bgcolor=#E9E9E9
| 343361 ||  || — || January 16, 2005 || Kitt Peak || Spacewatch || HOF || align=right | 3.6 km || 
|-id=362 bgcolor=#d6d6d6
| 343362 ||  || — || February 13, 2010 || Mount Lemmon || Mount Lemmon Survey || — || align=right | 4.8 km || 
|-id=363 bgcolor=#d6d6d6
| 343363 ||  || — || March 9, 2005 || Mount Lemmon || Mount Lemmon Survey || KOR || align=right | 1.5 km || 
|-id=364 bgcolor=#fefefe
| 343364 ||  || — || February 14, 2010 || Kitt Peak || Spacewatch || MAS || align=right data-sort-value="0.76" | 760 m || 
|-id=365 bgcolor=#E9E9E9
| 343365 ||  || — || February 14, 2010 || Kitt Peak || Spacewatch || — || align=right | 2.2 km || 
|-id=366 bgcolor=#E9E9E9
| 343366 ||  || — || September 26, 2003 || Apache Point || SDSS || — || align=right | 1.7 km || 
|-id=367 bgcolor=#E9E9E9
| 343367 ||  || — || February 14, 2010 || Mount Lemmon || Mount Lemmon Survey || MRX || align=right | 1.2 km || 
|-id=368 bgcolor=#fefefe
| 343368 ||  || — || October 9, 2001 || Kitt Peak || Spacewatch || NYS || align=right data-sort-value="0.63" | 630 m || 
|-id=369 bgcolor=#fefefe
| 343369 ||  || — || February 14, 2010 || Kitt Peak || Spacewatch || — || align=right data-sort-value="0.83" | 830 m || 
|-id=370 bgcolor=#E9E9E9
| 343370 ||  || — || February 14, 2010 || Kitt Peak || Spacewatch || — || align=right | 1.9 km || 
|-id=371 bgcolor=#d6d6d6
| 343371 ||  || — || February 14, 2010 || Kitt Peak || Spacewatch || HYG || align=right | 2.9 km || 
|-id=372 bgcolor=#E9E9E9
| 343372 ||  || — || February 14, 2010 || Mount Lemmon || Mount Lemmon Survey || AST || align=right | 3.1 km || 
|-id=373 bgcolor=#d6d6d6
| 343373 ||  || — || February 14, 2010 || Kitt Peak || Spacewatch || — || align=right | 4.5 km || 
|-id=374 bgcolor=#E9E9E9
| 343374 ||  || — || February 14, 2010 || Mount Lemmon || Mount Lemmon Survey || — || align=right | 2.3 km || 
|-id=375 bgcolor=#d6d6d6
| 343375 ||  || — || February 14, 2010 || Kitt Peak || Spacewatch || — || align=right | 3.5 km || 
|-id=376 bgcolor=#d6d6d6
| 343376 ||  || — || February 15, 2010 || Kitt Peak || Spacewatch || — || align=right | 3.8 km || 
|-id=377 bgcolor=#E9E9E9
| 343377 ||  || — || September 16, 2003 || Kitt Peak || Spacewatch || — || align=right | 1.9 km || 
|-id=378 bgcolor=#E9E9E9
| 343378 ||  || — || February 15, 2010 || Kitt Peak || Spacewatch || — || align=right | 2.9 km || 
|-id=379 bgcolor=#fefefe
| 343379 ||  || — || February 13, 2010 || Catalina || CSS || — || align=right | 2.3 km || 
|-id=380 bgcolor=#d6d6d6
| 343380 ||  || — || February 12, 2010 || WISE || WISE || — || align=right | 4.8 km || 
|-id=381 bgcolor=#d6d6d6
| 343381 ||  || — || February 14, 2010 || WISE || WISE || EOS || align=right | 4.1 km || 
|-id=382 bgcolor=#fefefe
| 343382 ||  || — || February 13, 2010 || Catalina || CSS || NYS || align=right data-sort-value="0.70" | 700 m || 
|-id=383 bgcolor=#fefefe
| 343383 ||  || — || February 14, 2010 || Mount Lemmon || Mount Lemmon Survey || — || align=right data-sort-value="0.68" | 680 m || 
|-id=384 bgcolor=#E9E9E9
| 343384 ||  || — || October 17, 1995 || Kitt Peak || Spacewatch || — || align=right | 1.7 km || 
|-id=385 bgcolor=#fefefe
| 343385 ||  || — || February 5, 2010 || Catalina || CSS || FLO || align=right data-sort-value="0.84" | 840 m || 
|-id=386 bgcolor=#E9E9E9
| 343386 ||  || — || February 13, 2010 || Mount Lemmon || Mount Lemmon Survey || — || align=right | 2.5 km || 
|-id=387 bgcolor=#fefefe
| 343387 ||  || — || October 22, 1998 || Caussols || ODAS || — || align=right data-sort-value="0.86" | 860 m || 
|-id=388 bgcolor=#E9E9E9
| 343388 ||  || — || December 2, 1994 || Kitt Peak || Spacewatch || — || align=right | 2.3 km || 
|-id=389 bgcolor=#E9E9E9
| 343389 ||  || — || February 14, 2010 || Mount Lemmon || Mount Lemmon Survey || AST || align=right | 2.7 km || 
|-id=390 bgcolor=#E9E9E9
| 343390 ||  || — || February 14, 2010 || Kitt Peak || Spacewatch || — || align=right | 2.6 km || 
|-id=391 bgcolor=#fefefe
| 343391 ||  || — || February 14, 2010 || Kitt Peak || Spacewatch || NYS || align=right data-sort-value="0.58" | 580 m || 
|-id=392 bgcolor=#fefefe
| 343392 ||  || — || January 16, 2003 || Palomar || NEAT || — || align=right data-sort-value="0.71" | 710 m || 
|-id=393 bgcolor=#E9E9E9
| 343393 ||  || — || February 15, 2010 || Kitt Peak || Spacewatch || DOR || align=right | 2.5 km || 
|-id=394 bgcolor=#d6d6d6
| 343394 ||  || — || February 6, 2010 || Kitt Peak || Spacewatch || — || align=right | 4.6 km || 
|-id=395 bgcolor=#E9E9E9
| 343395 ||  || — || February 9, 2010 || Kitt Peak || Spacewatch || WIT || align=right | 1.3 km || 
|-id=396 bgcolor=#fefefe
| 343396 ||  || — || March 27, 2003 || Kitt Peak || Spacewatch || MAS || align=right data-sort-value="0.86" | 860 m || 
|-id=397 bgcolor=#E9E9E9
| 343397 ||  || — || February 13, 2010 || Kitt Peak || Spacewatch || — || align=right | 1.4 km || 
|-id=398 bgcolor=#d6d6d6
| 343398 ||  || — || February 15, 2010 || Kitt Peak || Spacewatch || EOS || align=right | 2.0 km || 
|-id=399 bgcolor=#d6d6d6
| 343399 ||  || — || February 14, 2004 || Wrightwood || J. W. Young || — || align=right | 3.9 km || 
|-id=400 bgcolor=#E9E9E9
| 343400 ||  || — || February 10, 2010 || Kitt Peak || Spacewatch || — || align=right | 1.4 km || 
|}

343401–343500 

|-bgcolor=#E9E9E9
| 343401 ||  || — || February 13, 2010 || Kitt Peak || Spacewatch || — || align=right | 2.0 km || 
|-id=402 bgcolor=#E9E9E9
| 343402 ||  || — || February 13, 2010 || Mount Lemmon || Mount Lemmon Survey || WIT || align=right | 1.1 km || 
|-id=403 bgcolor=#E9E9E9
| 343403 ||  || — || September 21, 2003 || Kitt Peak || Spacewatch || — || align=right | 3.2 km || 
|-id=404 bgcolor=#E9E9E9
| 343404 ||  || — || October 24, 2005 || Mauna Kea || A. Boattini || — || align=right | 1.4 km || 
|-id=405 bgcolor=#E9E9E9
| 343405 ||  || — || February 15, 2010 || Kitt Peak || Spacewatch || — || align=right | 2.4 km || 
|-id=406 bgcolor=#E9E9E9
| 343406 ||  || — || February 9, 2010 || Kitt Peak || Spacewatch || — || align=right | 2.9 km || 
|-id=407 bgcolor=#fefefe
| 343407 ||  || — || February 9, 2010 || Kitt Peak || Spacewatch || NYS || align=right data-sort-value="0.64" | 640 m || 
|-id=408 bgcolor=#E9E9E9
| 343408 ||  || — || September 18, 2003 || Kitt Peak || Spacewatch || — || align=right | 2.4 km || 
|-id=409 bgcolor=#E9E9E9
| 343409 ||  || — || February 10, 2010 || Kitt Peak || Spacewatch || ADE || align=right | 3.7 km || 
|-id=410 bgcolor=#d6d6d6
| 343410 ||  || — || February 10, 2010 || Kitt Peak || Spacewatch || — || align=right | 3.9 km || 
|-id=411 bgcolor=#E9E9E9
| 343411 ||  || — || February 10, 2010 || Kitt Peak || Spacewatch || — || align=right | 2.7 km || 
|-id=412 bgcolor=#d6d6d6
| 343412 ||  || — || February 13, 2010 || Haleakala || Pan-STARRS || — || align=right | 3.3 km || 
|-id=413 bgcolor=#E9E9E9
| 343413 ||  || — || February 14, 2010 || Haleakala || Pan-STARRS || — || align=right | 1.8 km || 
|-id=414 bgcolor=#E9E9E9
| 343414 ||  || — || February 15, 2010 || Catalina || CSS || — || align=right | 1.5 km || 
|-id=415 bgcolor=#E9E9E9
| 343415 ||  || — || September 11, 2007 || Mount Lemmon || Mount Lemmon Survey || — || align=right | 3.1 km || 
|-id=416 bgcolor=#d6d6d6
| 343416 ||  || — || February 4, 2010 || WISE || WISE || EMA || align=right | 4.4 km || 
|-id=417 bgcolor=#E9E9E9
| 343417 ||  || — || December 18, 2009 || Mount Lemmon || Mount Lemmon Survey || — || align=right | 2.5 km || 
|-id=418 bgcolor=#E9E9E9
| 343418 ||  || — || February 18, 2010 || Catalina || CSS || BAR || align=right | 1.9 km || 
|-id=419 bgcolor=#fefefe
| 343419 ||  || — || November 1, 2005 || Kitt Peak || Spacewatch || NYS || align=right data-sort-value="0.65" | 650 m || 
|-id=420 bgcolor=#d6d6d6
| 343420 ||  || — || February 16, 2010 || Kitt Peak || Spacewatch || CHA || align=right | 2.1 km || 
|-id=421 bgcolor=#E9E9E9
| 343421 ||  || — || February 16, 2010 || Kitt Peak || Spacewatch || MRX || align=right | 1.2 km || 
|-id=422 bgcolor=#E9E9E9
| 343422 ||  || — || February 16, 2010 || Kitt Peak || Spacewatch || — || align=right | 1.4 km || 
|-id=423 bgcolor=#E9E9E9
| 343423 ||  || — || February 17, 2010 || WISE || WISE || — || align=right | 5.5 km || 
|-id=424 bgcolor=#E9E9E9
| 343424 ||  || — || March 27, 2007 || Siding Spring || SSS || — || align=right | 4.1 km || 
|-id=425 bgcolor=#E9E9E9
| 343425 ||  || — || February 19, 2010 || Bisei SG Center || BATTeRS || — || align=right | 2.5 km || 
|-id=426 bgcolor=#d6d6d6
| 343426 ||  || — || February 18, 2010 || WISE || WISE || — || align=right | 4.0 km || 
|-id=427 bgcolor=#d6d6d6
| 343427 ||  || — || May 12, 2004 || Siding Spring || SSS || — || align=right | 6.7 km || 
|-id=428 bgcolor=#E9E9E9
| 343428 ||  || — || September 11, 2007 || Mount Lemmon || Mount Lemmon Survey || — || align=right | 3.1 km || 
|-id=429 bgcolor=#E9E9E9
| 343429 ||  || — || February 16, 2010 || Catalina || CSS || RAF || align=right | 1.3 km || 
|-id=430 bgcolor=#E9E9E9
| 343430 ||  || — || February 17, 2010 || Kitt Peak || Spacewatch || — || align=right | 1.6 km || 
|-id=431 bgcolor=#E9E9E9
| 343431 ||  || — || December 14, 2004 || Kitt Peak || Spacewatch || — || align=right | 1.2 km || 
|-id=432 bgcolor=#E9E9E9
| 343432 ||  || — || February 17, 2010 || Kitt Peak || Spacewatch || — || align=right | 3.2 km || 
|-id=433 bgcolor=#fefefe
| 343433 ||  || — || February 17, 2010 || Kitt Peak || Spacewatch || NYS || align=right data-sort-value="0.58" | 580 m || 
|-id=434 bgcolor=#d6d6d6
| 343434 ||  || — || February 17, 2010 || Kitt Peak || Spacewatch || — || align=right | 3.4 km || 
|-id=435 bgcolor=#E9E9E9
| 343435 ||  || — || February 18, 2010 || Kitt Peak || Spacewatch || — || align=right | 2.6 km || 
|-id=436 bgcolor=#E9E9E9
| 343436 ||  || — || February 18, 2010 || Catalina || CSS || — || align=right | 4.4 km || 
|-id=437 bgcolor=#E9E9E9
| 343437 ||  || — || February 17, 2010 || Kitt Peak || Spacewatch || PAD || align=right | 3.0 km || 
|-id=438 bgcolor=#E9E9E9
| 343438 ||  || — || February 16, 2010 || Haleakala || Pan-STARRS || — || align=right | 2.5 km || 
|-id=439 bgcolor=#d6d6d6
| 343439 ||  || — || February 16, 2010 || Haleakala || Pan-STARRS || — || align=right | 3.6 km || 
|-id=440 bgcolor=#E9E9E9
| 343440 ||  || — || February 16, 2010 || Haleakala || Pan-STARRS || — || align=right | 1.3 km || 
|-id=441 bgcolor=#E9E9E9
| 343441 ||  || — || February 16, 2010 || Haleakala || Pan-STARRS || — || align=right | 1.4 km || 
|-id=442 bgcolor=#E9E9E9
| 343442 ||  || — || February 17, 2010 || Socorro || LINEAR || PAD || align=right | 3.2 km || 
|-id=443 bgcolor=#E9E9E9
| 343443 ||  || — || February 19, 2010 || Mount Lemmon || Mount Lemmon Survey || — || align=right | 2.9 km || 
|-id=444 bgcolor=#E9E9E9
| 343444 Halluzinelle ||  ||  || March 7, 2010 || Taunus || S. Karge, E. Schwab || — || align=right | 1.8 km || 
|-id=445 bgcolor=#E9E9E9
| 343445 ||  || — || March 5, 2010 || Kitt Peak || Spacewatch || EUN || align=right | 1.5 km || 
|-id=446 bgcolor=#E9E9E9
| 343446 ||  || — || March 5, 2010 || Catalina || CSS || — || align=right | 1.9 km || 
|-id=447 bgcolor=#E9E9E9
| 343447 ||  || — || March 4, 2010 || Kitt Peak || Spacewatch || PAD || align=right | 1.6 km || 
|-id=448 bgcolor=#d6d6d6
| 343448 ||  || — || March 8, 2005 || Mount Lemmon || Mount Lemmon Survey || KOR || align=right | 1.8 km || 
|-id=449 bgcolor=#E9E9E9
| 343449 ||  || — || March 4, 2010 || Kitt Peak || Spacewatch || — || align=right | 1.8 km || 
|-id=450 bgcolor=#E9E9E9
| 343450 ||  || — || March 5, 2010 || Kitt Peak || Spacewatch || — || align=right | 1.8 km || 
|-id=451 bgcolor=#d6d6d6
| 343451 ||  || — || October 11, 2007 || Mount Lemmon || Mount Lemmon Survey || — || align=right | 3.2 km || 
|-id=452 bgcolor=#E9E9E9
| 343452 ||  || — || March 10, 2010 || Purple Mountain || PMO NEO || — || align=right | 3.1 km || 
|-id=453 bgcolor=#E9E9E9
| 343453 ||  || — || March 10, 2010 || Purple Mountain || PMO NEO || — || align=right | 2.6 km || 
|-id=454 bgcolor=#E9E9E9
| 343454 ||  || — || March 10, 2010 || Purple Mountain || PMO NEO || GEF || align=right | 1.8 km || 
|-id=455 bgcolor=#d6d6d6
| 343455 ||  || — || March 10, 2010 || Purple Mountain || PMO NEO || EOS || align=right | 2.8 km || 
|-id=456 bgcolor=#fefefe
| 343456 ||  || — || March 10, 2010 || Purple Mountain || PMO NEO || — || align=right | 1.2 km || 
|-id=457 bgcolor=#E9E9E9
| 343457 ||  || — || March 10, 2010 || La Sagra || OAM Obs. || EUN || align=right | 1.7 km || 
|-id=458 bgcolor=#E9E9E9
| 343458 ||  || — || March 5, 2010 || Kitt Peak || Spacewatch || — || align=right | 3.1 km || 
|-id=459 bgcolor=#E9E9E9
| 343459 ||  || — || March 5, 2010 || Kitt Peak || Spacewatch || — || align=right | 1.2 km || 
|-id=460 bgcolor=#E9E9E9
| 343460 ||  || — || March 12, 2010 || Mount Lemmon || Mount Lemmon Survey || — || align=right | 1.6 km || 
|-id=461 bgcolor=#E9E9E9
| 343461 ||  || — || March 13, 2010 || Črni Vrh || Črni Vrh || MIT || align=right | 3.4 km || 
|-id=462 bgcolor=#E9E9E9
| 343462 ||  || — || March 13, 2010 || Dauban || F. Kugel || VIB || align=right | 2.1 km || 
|-id=463 bgcolor=#d6d6d6
| 343463 ||  || — || March 14, 2010 || Dauban || F. Kugel || KOR || align=right | 1.6 km || 
|-id=464 bgcolor=#d6d6d6
| 343464 ||  || — || March 14, 2010 || WISE || WISE || EUP || align=right | 4.8 km || 
|-id=465 bgcolor=#E9E9E9
| 343465 ||  || — || March 12, 2010 || Catalina || CSS || — || align=right | 2.3 km || 
|-id=466 bgcolor=#fefefe
| 343466 ||  || — || December 26, 2005 || Kitt Peak || Spacewatch || — || align=right data-sort-value="0.90" | 900 m || 
|-id=467 bgcolor=#d6d6d6
| 343467 ||  || — || October 4, 2007 || Catalina || CSS || — || align=right | 3.5 km || 
|-id=468 bgcolor=#E9E9E9
| 343468 ||  || — || March 12, 2010 || Catalina || CSS || — || align=right | 1.9 km || 
|-id=469 bgcolor=#E9E9E9
| 343469 ||  || — || March 13, 2010 || Catalina || CSS || — || align=right | 3.5 km || 
|-id=470 bgcolor=#E9E9E9
| 343470 ||  || — || March 13, 2010 || Kitt Peak || Spacewatch || — || align=right | 2.9 km || 
|-id=471 bgcolor=#d6d6d6
| 343471 ||  || — || March 12, 2010 || Kitt Peak || Spacewatch || — || align=right | 3.6 km || 
|-id=472 bgcolor=#d6d6d6
| 343472 ||  || — || March 10, 1999 || Kitt Peak || Spacewatch || — || align=right | 2.4 km || 
|-id=473 bgcolor=#E9E9E9
| 343473 ||  || — || March 12, 2010 || Mount Lemmon || Mount Lemmon Survey || WIT || align=right | 1.1 km || 
|-id=474 bgcolor=#E9E9E9
| 343474 ||  || — || March 2, 2005 || Catalina || CSS || — || align=right | 3.0 km || 
|-id=475 bgcolor=#E9E9E9
| 343475 ||  || — || October 3, 2008 || Mount Lemmon || Mount Lemmon Survey || — || align=right | 2.6 km || 
|-id=476 bgcolor=#E9E9E9
| 343476 ||  || — || March 12, 2010 || Kitt Peak || Spacewatch || — || align=right | 3.3 km || 
|-id=477 bgcolor=#d6d6d6
| 343477 ||  || — || March 12, 2010 || Mount Lemmon || Mount Lemmon Survey || — || align=right | 2.4 km || 
|-id=478 bgcolor=#E9E9E9
| 343478 ||  || — || March 12, 2010 || Mount Lemmon || Mount Lemmon Survey || AST || align=right | 2.5 km || 
|-id=479 bgcolor=#E9E9E9
| 343479 ||  || — || March 12, 2010 || Kitt Peak || Spacewatch || — || align=right | 3.1 km || 
|-id=480 bgcolor=#d6d6d6
| 343480 ||  || — || March 12, 2010 || Mount Lemmon || Mount Lemmon Survey || — || align=right | 2.9 km || 
|-id=481 bgcolor=#E9E9E9
| 343481 ||  || — || March 8, 2005 || Mount Lemmon || Mount Lemmon Survey || AGN || align=right | 1.5 km || 
|-id=482 bgcolor=#d6d6d6
| 343482 ||  || — || March 13, 2010 || Kitt Peak || Spacewatch || — || align=right | 2.2 km || 
|-id=483 bgcolor=#E9E9E9
| 343483 ||  || — || September 12, 2007 || Mount Lemmon || Mount Lemmon Survey || PAD || align=right | 1.8 km || 
|-id=484 bgcolor=#E9E9E9
| 343484 ||  || — || April 8, 2006 || Kitt Peak || Spacewatch || WIT || align=right | 1.2 km || 
|-id=485 bgcolor=#d6d6d6
| 343485 ||  || — || March 13, 2010 || Kitt Peak || Spacewatch || — || align=right | 3.8 km || 
|-id=486 bgcolor=#d6d6d6
| 343486 ||  || — || March 13, 2010 || Kitt Peak || Spacewatch || EOS || align=right | 1.9 km || 
|-id=487 bgcolor=#E9E9E9
| 343487 ||  || — || March 14, 2010 || La Sagra || OAM Obs. || — || align=right | 2.8 km || 
|-id=488 bgcolor=#E9E9E9
| 343488 ||  || — || May 3, 2006 || Kitt Peak || Spacewatch || — || align=right | 1.9 km || 
|-id=489 bgcolor=#d6d6d6
| 343489 ||  || — || March 9, 2005 || Mount Lemmon || Mount Lemmon Survey || — || align=right | 3.1 km || 
|-id=490 bgcolor=#fefefe
| 343490 ||  || — || September 20, 2008 || Kitt Peak || Spacewatch || V || align=right data-sort-value="0.57" | 570 m || 
|-id=491 bgcolor=#fefefe
| 343491 ||  || — || October 8, 1994 || Kitt Peak || Spacewatch || NYS || align=right data-sort-value="0.60" | 600 m || 
|-id=492 bgcolor=#d6d6d6
| 343492 ||  || — || November 12, 2007 || Mount Lemmon || Mount Lemmon Survey || — || align=right | 3.6 km || 
|-id=493 bgcolor=#d6d6d6
| 343493 ||  || — || March 14, 2010 || Kitt Peak || Spacewatch || — || align=right | 3.9 km || 
|-id=494 bgcolor=#E9E9E9
| 343494 ||  || — || September 4, 2007 || Mount Lemmon || Mount Lemmon Survey || PAD || align=right | 3.2 km || 
|-id=495 bgcolor=#E9E9E9
| 343495 ||  || — || September 12, 1998 || Kitt Peak || Spacewatch || WIT || align=right | 1.2 km || 
|-id=496 bgcolor=#d6d6d6
| 343496 ||  || — || March 15, 2010 || Kitt Peak || Spacewatch || — || align=right | 3.2 km || 
|-id=497 bgcolor=#d6d6d6
| 343497 ||  || — || March 10, 2005 || Mount Lemmon || Mount Lemmon Survey || — || align=right | 2.2 km || 
|-id=498 bgcolor=#d6d6d6
| 343498 ||  || — || February 14, 2010 || Kitt Peak || Spacewatch || EOS || align=right | 2.6 km || 
|-id=499 bgcolor=#E9E9E9
| 343499 ||  || — || March 12, 2010 || Kitt Peak || Spacewatch || — || align=right | 2.3 km || 
|-id=500 bgcolor=#E9E9E9
| 343500 ||  || — || March 12, 2010 || Catalina || CSS || — || align=right | 2.4 km || 
|}

343501–343600 

|-bgcolor=#E9E9E9
| 343501 ||  || — || March 13, 2010 || Catalina || CSS || — || align=right | 2.9 km || 
|-id=502 bgcolor=#E9E9E9
| 343502 ||  || — || March 13, 2010 || Catalina || CSS || — || align=right | 2.7 km || 
|-id=503 bgcolor=#d6d6d6
| 343503 ||  || — || March 12, 2010 || Kitt Peak || Spacewatch || — || align=right | 3.9 km || 
|-id=504 bgcolor=#E9E9E9
| 343504 ||  || — || March 13, 2010 || Kitt Peak || Spacewatch || — || align=right | 2.8 km || 
|-id=505 bgcolor=#d6d6d6
| 343505 ||  || — || March 13, 2010 || Kitt Peak || Spacewatch || — || align=right | 4.6 km || 
|-id=506 bgcolor=#E9E9E9
| 343506 ||  || — || March 4, 2010 || Kitt Peak || Spacewatch || — || align=right | 2.5 km || 
|-id=507 bgcolor=#d6d6d6
| 343507 ||  || — || March 12, 2010 || Kitt Peak || Spacewatch || — || align=right | 3.9 km || 
|-id=508 bgcolor=#d6d6d6
| 343508 ||  || — || March 12, 2010 || Kitt Peak || Spacewatch || EOS || align=right | 2.3 km || 
|-id=509 bgcolor=#d6d6d6
| 343509 ||  || — || March 15, 2010 || Kitt Peak || Spacewatch || VER || align=right | 4.3 km || 
|-id=510 bgcolor=#d6d6d6
| 343510 ||  || — || March 12, 2010 || Kitt Peak || Spacewatch || — || align=right | 4.1 km || 
|-id=511 bgcolor=#d6d6d6
| 343511 ||  || — || March 13, 2010 || Kitt Peak || Spacewatch || — || align=right | 4.8 km || 
|-id=512 bgcolor=#d6d6d6
| 343512 ||  || — || August 16, 2006 || Siding Spring || SSS || — || align=right | 3.4 km || 
|-id=513 bgcolor=#d6d6d6
| 343513 ||  || — || March 14, 2010 || Kitt Peak || Spacewatch || — || align=right | 4.1 km || 
|-id=514 bgcolor=#d6d6d6
| 343514 ||  || — || March 14, 2010 || Kitt Peak || Spacewatch || — || align=right | 2.7 km || 
|-id=515 bgcolor=#d6d6d6
| 343515 ||  || — || March 15, 2010 || Kitt Peak || Spacewatch || EOS || align=right | 4.8 km || 
|-id=516 bgcolor=#E9E9E9
| 343516 ||  || — || March 15, 2010 || Mount Lemmon || Mount Lemmon Survey || HOF || align=right | 3.0 km || 
|-id=517 bgcolor=#E9E9E9
| 343517 ||  || — || March 12, 2010 || Mount Lemmon || Mount Lemmon Survey || — || align=right | 3.5 km || 
|-id=518 bgcolor=#E9E9E9
| 343518 ||  || — || February 1, 2001 || Socorro || LINEAR || — || align=right | 2.7 km || 
|-id=519 bgcolor=#E9E9E9
| 343519 ||  || — || March 13, 2010 || Catalina || CSS || MIT || align=right | 2.5 km || 
|-id=520 bgcolor=#E9E9E9
| 343520 ||  || — || September 11, 2007 || Kitt Peak || Spacewatch || — || align=right | 2.3 km || 
|-id=521 bgcolor=#E9E9E9
| 343521 ||  || — || March 13, 2010 || Kitt Peak || Spacewatch || WIT || align=right | 1.1 km || 
|-id=522 bgcolor=#E9E9E9
| 343522 ||  || — || March 13, 2010 || Kitt Peak || Spacewatch || PAD || align=right | 2.7 km || 
|-id=523 bgcolor=#d6d6d6
| 343523 ||  || — || March 15, 2010 || Kitt Peak || Spacewatch || 628 || align=right | 3.3 km || 
|-id=524 bgcolor=#d6d6d6
| 343524 ||  || — || August 14, 2002 || Kitt Peak || Spacewatch || KOR || align=right | 1.6 km || 
|-id=525 bgcolor=#d6d6d6
| 343525 ||  || — || March 13, 2010 || Kitt Peak || Spacewatch || — || align=right | 2.9 km || 
|-id=526 bgcolor=#E9E9E9
| 343526 ||  || — || March 13, 2010 || Kitt Peak || Spacewatch || MIS || align=right | 2.9 km || 
|-id=527 bgcolor=#E9E9E9
| 343527 ||  || — || March 4, 2010 || Kitt Peak || Spacewatch || GEF || align=right | 1.6 km || 
|-id=528 bgcolor=#d6d6d6
| 343528 ||  || — || March 12, 2010 || Kitt Peak || Spacewatch || VER || align=right | 4.1 km || 
|-id=529 bgcolor=#fefefe
| 343529 ||  || — || March 14, 2010 || Kitt Peak || Spacewatch || — || align=right data-sort-value="0.81" | 810 m || 
|-id=530 bgcolor=#d6d6d6
| 343530 ||  || — || March 13, 2010 || Mount Lemmon || Mount Lemmon Survey || — || align=right | 3.9 km || 
|-id=531 bgcolor=#E9E9E9
| 343531 ||  || — || March 14, 2010 || Kitt Peak || Spacewatch || — || align=right | 2.5 km || 
|-id=532 bgcolor=#d6d6d6
| 343532 ||  || — || March 12, 2010 || Catalina || CSS || — || align=right | 4.8 km || 
|-id=533 bgcolor=#d6d6d6
| 343533 ||  || — || March 13, 2010 || Kitt Peak || Spacewatch || — || align=right | 4.0 km || 
|-id=534 bgcolor=#d6d6d6
| 343534 ||  || — || March 13, 2010 || Mount Lemmon || Mount Lemmon Survey || HIL3:2 || align=right | 6.9 km || 
|-id=535 bgcolor=#d6d6d6
| 343535 ||  || — || March 13, 2010 || Kitt Peak || Spacewatch || EOS || align=right | 1.9 km || 
|-id=536 bgcolor=#E9E9E9
| 343536 ||  || — || March 10, 2010 || La Sagra || OAM Obs. || — || align=right | 1.0 km || 
|-id=537 bgcolor=#E9E9E9
| 343537 ||  || — || March 14, 2010 || Catalina || CSS || — || align=right | 2.4 km || 
|-id=538 bgcolor=#E9E9E9
| 343538 ||  || — || March 16, 2010 || Dauban || F. Kugel || — || align=right | 1.3 km || 
|-id=539 bgcolor=#E9E9E9
| 343539 ||  || — || November 6, 2008 || Mount Lemmon || Mount Lemmon Survey || — || align=right | 2.5 km || 
|-id=540 bgcolor=#E9E9E9
| 343540 ||  || — || March 16, 2010 || Mount Lemmon || Mount Lemmon Survey || HOF || align=right | 4.1 km || 
|-id=541 bgcolor=#E9E9E9
| 343541 ||  || — || March 18, 2010 || Mayhill || A. Lowe || — || align=right | 2.2 km || 
|-id=542 bgcolor=#d6d6d6
| 343542 ||  || — || March 16, 2010 || Kitt Peak || Spacewatch || EUP || align=right | 4.6 km || 
|-id=543 bgcolor=#E9E9E9
| 343543 ||  || — || March 16, 2010 || Kitt Peak || Spacewatch || — || align=right data-sort-value="0.93" | 930 m || 
|-id=544 bgcolor=#d6d6d6
| 343544 ||  || — || October 19, 2007 || Kitt Peak || Spacewatch || — || align=right | 2.9 km || 
|-id=545 bgcolor=#d6d6d6
| 343545 ||  || — || March 17, 2010 || Kitt Peak || Spacewatch || — || align=right | 3.2 km || 
|-id=546 bgcolor=#d6d6d6
| 343546 ||  || — || March 18, 2010 || Kitt Peak || Spacewatch || — || align=right | 3.3 km || 
|-id=547 bgcolor=#E9E9E9
| 343547 ||  || — || March 26, 2006 || Kitt Peak || Spacewatch || — || align=right | 2.5 km || 
|-id=548 bgcolor=#d6d6d6
| 343548 ||  || — || November 26, 2003 || Kitt Peak || Spacewatch || — || align=right | 2.6 km || 
|-id=549 bgcolor=#E9E9E9
| 343549 ||  || — || March 19, 2010 || Kitt Peak || Spacewatch || — || align=right | 1.3 km || 
|-id=550 bgcolor=#E9E9E9
| 343550 ||  || — || March 19, 2010 || Mount Lemmon || Mount Lemmon Survey || — || align=right | 2.4 km || 
|-id=551 bgcolor=#E9E9E9
| 343551 ||  || — || April 7, 2006 || Kitt Peak || Spacewatch || — || align=right | 2.0 km || 
|-id=552 bgcolor=#d6d6d6
| 343552 ||  || — || February 29, 2004 || Kitt Peak || Spacewatch || — || align=right | 3.6 km || 
|-id=553 bgcolor=#d6d6d6
| 343553 ||  || — || March 17, 2010 || Kitt Peak || Spacewatch || — || align=right | 2.6 km || 
|-id=554 bgcolor=#E9E9E9
| 343554 ||  || — || March 17, 2010 || Kitt Peak || Spacewatch || — || align=right | 2.6 km || 
|-id=555 bgcolor=#d6d6d6
| 343555 ||  || — || March 18, 2010 || Kitt Peak || Spacewatch || THM || align=right | 2.9 km || 
|-id=556 bgcolor=#E9E9E9
| 343556 ||  || — || March 20, 2010 || Kitt Peak || Spacewatch || WIT || align=right | 1.1 km || 
|-id=557 bgcolor=#E9E9E9
| 343557 ||  || — || March 22, 2010 || ESA OGS || ESA OGS || — || align=right | 2.7 km || 
|-id=558 bgcolor=#E9E9E9
| 343558 ||  || — || March 18, 2010 || Kitt Peak || Spacewatch || — || align=right | 2.8 km || 
|-id=559 bgcolor=#E9E9E9
| 343559 ||  || — || October 21, 2007 || Mount Lemmon || Mount Lemmon Survey || HEN || align=right | 1.3 km || 
|-id=560 bgcolor=#d6d6d6
| 343560 ||  || — || March 20, 2010 || Kitt Peak || Spacewatch || EOS || align=right | 3.3 km || 
|-id=561 bgcolor=#E9E9E9
| 343561 ||  || — || March 21, 2010 || Kitt Peak || Spacewatch || — || align=right | 2.2 km || 
|-id=562 bgcolor=#E9E9E9
| 343562 ||  || — || March 16, 2010 || Mount Lemmon || Mount Lemmon Survey || — || align=right | 3.0 km || 
|-id=563 bgcolor=#E9E9E9
| 343563 ||  || — || March 21, 2010 || Kitt Peak || Spacewatch || — || align=right | 3.3 km || 
|-id=564 bgcolor=#E9E9E9
| 343564 ||  || — || March 16, 2010 || Kitt Peak || Spacewatch || — || align=right | 2.8 km || 
|-id=565 bgcolor=#E9E9E9
| 343565 ||  || — || March 16, 2010 || Mount Lemmon || Mount Lemmon Survey || — || align=right | 3.3 km || 
|-id=566 bgcolor=#E9E9E9
| 343566 ||  || — || November 4, 2004 || Kitt Peak || Spacewatch || — || align=right | 1.2 km || 
|-id=567 bgcolor=#d6d6d6
| 343567 ||  || — || March 24, 1995 || Kitt Peak || Spacewatch || NAE || align=right | 3.1 km || 
|-id=568 bgcolor=#E9E9E9
| 343568 ||  || — || March 23, 2006 || Kitt Peak || Spacewatch || — || align=right | 1.2 km || 
|-id=569 bgcolor=#d6d6d6
| 343569 ||  || — || January 17, 2004 || Palomar || NEAT || — || align=right | 2.9 km || 
|-id=570 bgcolor=#E9E9E9
| 343570 ||  || — || March 25, 2010 || Mount Lemmon || Mount Lemmon Survey || — || align=right | 3.0 km || 
|-id=571 bgcolor=#E9E9E9
| 343571 ||  || — || March 19, 2010 || Mount Lemmon || Mount Lemmon Survey || HOF || align=right | 3.3 km || 
|-id=572 bgcolor=#d6d6d6
| 343572 ||  || — || March 19, 2010 || Mount Lemmon || Mount Lemmon Survey || EMA || align=right | 5.4 km || 
|-id=573 bgcolor=#d6d6d6
| 343573 ||  || — || January 8, 2010 || Mount Lemmon || Mount Lemmon Survey || — || align=right | 3.1 km || 
|-id=574 bgcolor=#E9E9E9
| 343574 ||  || — || March 26, 2010 || Kitt Peak || Spacewatch || WIT || align=right | 1.3 km || 
|-id=575 bgcolor=#d6d6d6
| 343575 ||  || — || March 20, 2010 || Kitt Peak || Spacewatch || VER || align=right | 4.0 km || 
|-id=576 bgcolor=#fefefe
| 343576 ||  || — || March 19, 2010 || Catalina || CSS || PHO || align=right | 1.7 km || 
|-id=577 bgcolor=#d6d6d6
| 343577 ||  || — || March 22, 2010 || ESA OGS || ESA OGS || THM || align=right | 2.4 km || 
|-id=578 bgcolor=#d6d6d6
| 343578 ||  || — || March 25, 2010 || Kitt Peak || Spacewatch || — || align=right | 4.7 km || 
|-id=579 bgcolor=#E9E9E9
| 343579 ||  || — || March 17, 2010 || Kitt Peak || Spacewatch || — || align=right | 2.1 km || 
|-id=580 bgcolor=#E9E9E9
| 343580 ||  || — || March 18, 2010 || Mount Lemmon || Mount Lemmon Survey || HOF || align=right | 2.7 km || 
|-id=581 bgcolor=#E9E9E9
| 343581 ||  || — || March 21, 2010 || Mount Lemmon || Mount Lemmon Survey || AGN || align=right | 1.2 km || 
|-id=582 bgcolor=#d6d6d6
| 343582 ||  || — || March 21, 2010 || Kitt Peak || Spacewatch || NAE || align=right | 3.2 km || 
|-id=583 bgcolor=#E9E9E9
| 343583 ||  || — || October 19, 2003 || Kitt Peak || Spacewatch || — || align=right | 1.5 km || 
|-id=584 bgcolor=#d6d6d6
| 343584 ||  || — || December 21, 2008 || Mount Lemmon || Mount Lemmon Survey || KAR || align=right | 1.4 km || 
|-id=585 bgcolor=#d6d6d6
| 343585 ||  || — || March 25, 2010 || Kitt Peak || Spacewatch || HYG || align=right | 3.1 km || 
|-id=586 bgcolor=#C2FFFF
| 343586 ||  || — || February 17, 2007 || Kitt Peak || Spacewatch || L5 || align=right | 13 km || 
|-id=587 bgcolor=#E9E9E9
| 343587 Mamuna ||  ||  || April 5, 2010 || Zelenchukskaya S || T. V. Kryachko || — || align=right | 4.2 km || 
|-id=588 bgcolor=#d6d6d6
| 343588 ||  || — || April 5, 2010 || Kitt Peak || Spacewatch || EOS || align=right | 2.5 km || 
|-id=589 bgcolor=#d6d6d6
| 343589 ||  || — || April 6, 2010 || Catalina || CSS || — || align=right | 2.4 km || 
|-id=590 bgcolor=#E9E9E9
| 343590 ||  || — || April 10, 2010 || Catalina || CSS || — || align=right | 2.4 km || 
|-id=591 bgcolor=#E9E9E9
| 343591 ||  || — || April 7, 2010 || Socorro || LINEAR || — || align=right | 3.5 km || 
|-id=592 bgcolor=#E9E9E9
| 343592 ||  || — || April 8, 2010 || Kitt Peak || Spacewatch || EUN || align=right | 1.9 km || 
|-id=593 bgcolor=#fefefe
| 343593 ||  || — || April 14, 2010 || WISE || WISE || — || align=right | 1.5 km || 
|-id=594 bgcolor=#d6d6d6
| 343594 ||  || — || April 7, 2010 || Kitt Peak || Spacewatch || — || align=right | 3.1 km || 
|-id=595 bgcolor=#d6d6d6
| 343595 ||  || — || April 11, 2010 || Kitt Peak || Spacewatch || VER || align=right | 3.8 km || 
|-id=596 bgcolor=#d6d6d6
| 343596 ||  || — || January 16, 2009 || Kitt Peak || Spacewatch || — || align=right | 3.3 km || 
|-id=597 bgcolor=#d6d6d6
| 343597 ||  || — || May 2, 2005 || Kitt Peak || Spacewatch || CHA || align=right | 2.2 km || 
|-id=598 bgcolor=#d6d6d6
| 343598 ||  || — || April 6, 2010 || Kitt Peak || Spacewatch || — || align=right | 3.8 km || 
|-id=599 bgcolor=#E9E9E9
| 343599 ||  || — || April 7, 2010 || Mount Lemmon || Mount Lemmon Survey || — || align=right | 3.8 km || 
|-id=600 bgcolor=#E9E9E9
| 343600 ||  || — || April 8, 2010 || Mount Lemmon || Mount Lemmon Survey || — || align=right | 1.3 km || 
|}

343601–343700 

|-bgcolor=#d6d6d6
| 343601 ||  || — || April 9, 2010 || Kitt Peak || Spacewatch || — || align=right | 2.9 km || 
|-id=602 bgcolor=#d6d6d6
| 343602 ||  || — || April 9, 2010 || Kitt Peak || Spacewatch || — || align=right | 3.8 km || 
|-id=603 bgcolor=#d6d6d6
| 343603 ||  || — || April 9, 2010 || Mount Lemmon || Mount Lemmon Survey || EOS || align=right | 1.7 km || 
|-id=604 bgcolor=#d6d6d6
| 343604 ||  || — || December 19, 2003 || Kitt Peak || Spacewatch || — || align=right | 2.8 km || 
|-id=605 bgcolor=#d6d6d6
| 343605 ||  || — || September 14, 2006 || Catalina || CSS || — || align=right | 2.6 km || 
|-id=606 bgcolor=#d6d6d6
| 343606 ||  || — || April 10, 2010 || Kitt Peak || Spacewatch || — || align=right | 2.7 km || 
|-id=607 bgcolor=#d6d6d6
| 343607 ||  || — || October 18, 2001 || Kitt Peak || Spacewatch || — || align=right | 3.6 km || 
|-id=608 bgcolor=#d6d6d6
| 343608 ||  || — || April 10, 2010 || Kitt Peak || Spacewatch || — || align=right | 2.4 km || 
|-id=609 bgcolor=#E9E9E9
| 343609 ||  || — || April 10, 2010 || Kitt Peak || Spacewatch || — || align=right | 1.8 km || 
|-id=610 bgcolor=#E9E9E9
| 343610 ||  || — || April 10, 2010 || Kitt Peak || Spacewatch || — || align=right | 3.1 km || 
|-id=611 bgcolor=#d6d6d6
| 343611 ||  || — || April 12, 2010 || Mount Lemmon || Mount Lemmon Survey || — || align=right | 3.0 km || 
|-id=612 bgcolor=#d6d6d6
| 343612 ||  || — || September 26, 2006 || Mount Lemmon || Mount Lemmon Survey || EOS || align=right | 2.2 km || 
|-id=613 bgcolor=#E9E9E9
| 343613 ||  || — || April 13, 2010 || Vail-Jarnac || Jarnac Obs. || — || align=right | 2.4 km || 
|-id=614 bgcolor=#E9E9E9
| 343614 ||  || — || April 8, 2010 || Kitt Peak || Spacewatch || — || align=right | 3.1 km || 
|-id=615 bgcolor=#d6d6d6
| 343615 ||  || — || April 8, 2010 || Kitt Peak || Spacewatch || ARM || align=right | 4.1 km || 
|-id=616 bgcolor=#d6d6d6
| 343616 ||  || — || April 10, 2010 || Kitt Peak || Spacewatch || — || align=right | 4.8 km || 
|-id=617 bgcolor=#d6d6d6
| 343617 ||  || — || April 4, 2010 || Catalina || CSS || — || align=right | 3.4 km || 
|-id=618 bgcolor=#E9E9E9
| 343618 ||  || — || December 9, 2004 || Catalina || CSS || — || align=right | 1.5 km || 
|-id=619 bgcolor=#d6d6d6
| 343619 ||  || — || April 6, 2010 || Mount Lemmon || Mount Lemmon Survey || — || align=right | 3.8 km || 
|-id=620 bgcolor=#d6d6d6
| 343620 ||  || — || April 6, 2010 || Kitt Peak || Spacewatch || — || align=right | 4.3 km || 
|-id=621 bgcolor=#E9E9E9
| 343621 ||  || — || April 7, 2010 || Mount Lemmon || Mount Lemmon Survey || NEM || align=right | 2.9 km || 
|-id=622 bgcolor=#d6d6d6
| 343622 ||  || — || April 7, 2010 || Mount Lemmon || Mount Lemmon Survey || — || align=right | 3.8 km || 
|-id=623 bgcolor=#E9E9E9
| 343623 ||  || — || September 10, 2007 || Kitt Peak || Spacewatch || — || align=right | 2.8 km || 
|-id=624 bgcolor=#E9E9E9
| 343624 ||  || — || April 7, 2010 || Mount Lemmon || Mount Lemmon Survey || RAF || align=right | 1.4 km || 
|-id=625 bgcolor=#d6d6d6
| 343625 ||  || — || April 9, 2010 || Catalina || CSS || — || align=right | 4.3 km || 
|-id=626 bgcolor=#d6d6d6
| 343626 ||  || — || April 14, 2010 || Mount Lemmon || Mount Lemmon Survey || 627 || align=right | 4.7 km || 
|-id=627 bgcolor=#C2FFFF
| 343627 ||  || — || April 20, 2010 || WISE || WISE || L5 || align=right | 14 km || 
|-id=628 bgcolor=#C2FFFF
| 343628 ||  || — || April 22, 2010 || WISE || WISE || L5 || align=right | 11 km || 
|-id=629 bgcolor=#d6d6d6
| 343629 ||  || — || April 20, 2010 || Kitt Peak || Spacewatch || — || align=right | 3.1 km || 
|-id=630 bgcolor=#E9E9E9
| 343630 ||  || — || April 30, 2010 || WISE || WISE || — || align=right | 2.8 km || 
|-id=631 bgcolor=#E9E9E9
| 343631 ||  || — || October 18, 2003 || Kitt Peak || Spacewatch || GEF || align=right | 1.5 km || 
|-id=632 bgcolor=#E9E9E9
| 343632 ||  || — || April 25, 2010 || Mount Lemmon || Mount Lemmon Survey || — || align=right | 2.4 km || 
|-id=633 bgcolor=#d6d6d6
| 343633 ||  || — || April 26, 2010 || Mount Lemmon || Mount Lemmon Survey || — || align=right | 4.2 km || 
|-id=634 bgcolor=#C2FFFF
| 343634 ||  || — || April 29, 2008 || Mount Lemmon || Mount Lemmon Survey || L5 || align=right | 16 km || 
|-id=635 bgcolor=#fefefe
| 343635 ||  || — || May 1, 2010 || WISE || WISE || — || align=right | 1.9 km || 
|-id=636 bgcolor=#d6d6d6
| 343636 ||  || — || May 2, 2010 || Kitt Peak || Spacewatch || — || align=right | 2.8 km || 
|-id=637 bgcolor=#d6d6d6
| 343637 ||  || — || May 2, 2010 || Kitt Peak || Spacewatch || — || align=right | 4.1 km || 
|-id=638 bgcolor=#E9E9E9
| 343638 ||  || — || May 5, 2010 || Nogales || Tenagra II Obs. || — || align=right | 2.6 km || 
|-id=639 bgcolor=#E9E9E9
| 343639 ||  || — || January 20, 2009 || Mount Lemmon || Mount Lemmon Survey || — || align=right | 2.2 km || 
|-id=640 bgcolor=#E9E9E9
| 343640 ||  || — || May 4, 2010 || Siding Spring || SSS || — || align=right | 1.6 km || 
|-id=641 bgcolor=#d6d6d6
| 343641 ||  || — || October 21, 2007 || Mount Lemmon || Mount Lemmon Survey || — || align=right | 2.5 km || 
|-id=642 bgcolor=#C2FFFF
| 343642 ||  || — || May 7, 2010 || WISE || WISE || L5 || align=right | 14 km || 
|-id=643 bgcolor=#E9E9E9
| 343643 ||  || — || May 9, 2010 || Mount Lemmon || Mount Lemmon Survey || JUN || align=right | 4.1 km || 
|-id=644 bgcolor=#C2FFFF
| 343644 ||  || — || December 18, 2004 || Mount Lemmon || Mount Lemmon Survey || L5 || align=right | 13 km || 
|-id=645 bgcolor=#d6d6d6
| 343645 ||  || — || May 5, 2010 || Mount Lemmon || Mount Lemmon Survey || — || align=right | 3.4 km || 
|-id=646 bgcolor=#d6d6d6
| 343646 ||  || — || May 4, 2005 || Kitt Peak || Spacewatch || — || align=right | 3.4 km || 
|-id=647 bgcolor=#d6d6d6
| 343647 ||  || — || May 11, 2010 || Mount Lemmon || Mount Lemmon Survey || — || align=right | 4.1 km || 
|-id=648 bgcolor=#d6d6d6
| 343648 ||  || — || September 20, 2006 || Catalina || CSS || — || align=right | 4.7 km || 
|-id=649 bgcolor=#d6d6d6
| 343649 ||  || — || November 20, 2001 || Socorro || LINEAR || EOS || align=right | 2.4 km || 
|-id=650 bgcolor=#fefefe
| 343650 ||  || — || May 10, 2010 || WISE || WISE || SUL || align=right | 2.2 km || 
|-id=651 bgcolor=#d6d6d6
| 343651 ||  || — || May 8, 2010 || Siding Spring || SSS || — || align=right | 3.4 km || 
|-id=652 bgcolor=#d6d6d6
| 343652 ||  || — || September 5, 2000 || Kitt Peak || Spacewatch || — || align=right | 4.7 km || 
|-id=653 bgcolor=#d6d6d6
| 343653 ||  || — || May 12, 2010 || Mount Lemmon || Mount Lemmon Survey || — || align=right | 4.0 km || 
|-id=654 bgcolor=#E9E9E9
| 343654 ||  || — || May 16, 2010 || Kitt Peak || Spacewatch || MAR || align=right | 1.6 km || 
|-id=655 bgcolor=#d6d6d6
| 343655 ||  || — || May 19, 2010 || Mount Lemmon || Mount Lemmon Survey || — || align=right | 2.9 km || 
|-id=656 bgcolor=#d6d6d6
| 343656 ||  || — || June 8, 2010 || WISE || WISE || — || align=right | 3.2 km || 
|-id=657 bgcolor=#d6d6d6
| 343657 ||  || — || June 5, 2010 || Kitt Peak || Spacewatch || HYG || align=right | 3.1 km || 
|-id=658 bgcolor=#d6d6d6
| 343658 ||  || — || June 11, 2010 || Mount Lemmon || Mount Lemmon Survey || — || align=right | 4.6 km || 
|-id=659 bgcolor=#d6d6d6
| 343659 ||  || — || January 4, 2003 || Socorro || LINEAR || — || align=right | 3.6 km || 
|-id=660 bgcolor=#E9E9E9
| 343660 ||  || — || January 27, 1993 || Caussols || E. W. Elst || — || align=right | 1.7 km || 
|-id=661 bgcolor=#d6d6d6
| 343661 ||  || — || March 15, 2004 || Kitt Peak || Spacewatch || — || align=right | 4.6 km || 
|-id=662 bgcolor=#E9E9E9
| 343662 ||  || — || June 23, 2010 || WISE || WISE || GEF || align=right | 3.8 km || 
|-id=663 bgcolor=#C2FFFF
| 343663 ||  || — || October 21, 2001 || Kitt Peak || Spacewatch || L5 || align=right | 10 km || 
|-id=664 bgcolor=#d6d6d6
| 343664 Nataliemainzer ||  ||  || July 6, 2010 || WISE || WISE || — || align=right | 4.5 km || 
|-id=665 bgcolor=#d6d6d6
| 343665 ||  || — || July 15, 2010 || WISE || WISE || EUP || align=right | 4.3 km || 
|-id=666 bgcolor=#d6d6d6
| 343666 ||  || — || July 21, 2010 || WISE || WISE || — || align=right | 5.3 km || 
|-id=667 bgcolor=#d6d6d6
| 343667 ||  || — || July 22, 2010 || WISE || WISE || URS || align=right | 4.4 km || 
|-id=668 bgcolor=#d6d6d6
| 343668 ||  || — || July 22, 2010 || WISE || WISE || EMA || align=right | 4.9 km || 
|-id=669 bgcolor=#d6d6d6
| 343669 ||  || — || July 23, 2010 || WISE || WISE || FIR || align=right | 3.9 km || 
|-id=670 bgcolor=#d6d6d6
| 343670 ||  || — || July 23, 2010 || WISE || WISE || — || align=right | 4.4 km || 
|-id=671 bgcolor=#d6d6d6
| 343671 ||  || — || July 23, 2010 || WISE || WISE || — || align=right | 4.5 km || 
|-id=672 bgcolor=#d6d6d6
| 343672 ||  || — || July 25, 2010 || WISE || WISE || — || align=right | 4.3 km || 
|-id=673 bgcolor=#d6d6d6
| 343673 ||  || — || July 25, 2010 || WISE || WISE || — || align=right | 4.4 km || 
|-id=674 bgcolor=#d6d6d6
| 343674 ||  || — || July 25, 2010 || WISE || WISE || 7:4 || align=right | 4.9 km || 
|-id=675 bgcolor=#d6d6d6
| 343675 ||  || — || July 26, 2010 || WISE || WISE || — || align=right | 3.1 km || 
|-id=676 bgcolor=#d6d6d6
| 343676 ||  || — || January 1, 2009 || Mount Lemmon || Mount Lemmon Survey || HYG || align=right | 3.0 km || 
|-id=677 bgcolor=#E9E9E9
| 343677 ||  || — || April 22, 2009 || Mount Lemmon || Mount Lemmon Survey || — || align=right | 1.3 km || 
|-id=678 bgcolor=#E9E9E9
| 343678 ||  || — || July 12, 2005 || Mount Lemmon || Mount Lemmon Survey || — || align=right | 2.8 km || 
|-id=679 bgcolor=#d6d6d6
| 343679 ||  || — || August 22, 2004 || Kitt Peak || Spacewatch || EOS || align=right | 2.0 km || 
|-id=680 bgcolor=#C2FFFF
| 343680 ||  || — || October 17, 2010 || Mount Lemmon || Mount Lemmon Survey || L4 || align=right | 11 km || 
|-id=681 bgcolor=#C2FFFF
| 343681 ||  || — || June 23, 2007 || Kitt Peak || Spacewatch || L4 || align=right | 12 km || 
|-id=682 bgcolor=#E9E9E9
| 343682 ||  || — || January 6, 2002 || Kitt Peak || Spacewatch || — || align=right | 2.0 km || 
|-id=683 bgcolor=#E9E9E9
| 343683 ||  || — || October 17, 2001 || Palomar || NEAT || — || align=right | 1.8 km || 
|-id=684 bgcolor=#fefefe
| 343684 ||  || — || August 28, 2005 || Kitt Peak || Spacewatch || NYS || align=right data-sort-value="0.73" | 730 m || 
|-id=685 bgcolor=#fefefe
| 343685 ||  || — || March 29, 1998 || Socorro || LINEAR || H || align=right data-sort-value="0.64" | 640 m || 
|-id=686 bgcolor=#E9E9E9
| 343686 ||  || — || July 5, 2003 || Kitt Peak || Spacewatch || — || align=right | 1.6 km || 
|-id=687 bgcolor=#fefefe
| 343687 ||  || — || August 6, 2005 || Palomar || NEAT || — || align=right data-sort-value="0.80" | 800 m || 
|-id=688 bgcolor=#E9E9E9
| 343688 ||  || — || March 2, 2007 || Palomar || NEAT || — || align=right | 2.1 km || 
|-id=689 bgcolor=#C2FFFF
| 343689 ||  || — || September 19, 1998 || Apache Point || SDSS || L4 || align=right | 11 km || 
|-id=690 bgcolor=#d6d6d6
| 343690 ||  || — || September 27, 2009 || Mount Lemmon || Mount Lemmon Survey || — || align=right | 3.0 km || 
|-id=691 bgcolor=#fefefe
| 343691 ||  || — || September 30, 2005 || Mount Lemmon || Mount Lemmon Survey || NYS || align=right data-sort-value="0.82" | 820 m || 
|-id=692 bgcolor=#fefefe
| 343692 ||  || — || April 28, 2008 || Kitt Peak || Spacewatch || — || align=right data-sort-value="0.68" | 680 m || 
|-id=693 bgcolor=#E9E9E9
| 343693 ||  || — || September 3, 2008 || Kitt Peak || Spacewatch || — || align=right data-sort-value="0.94" | 940 m || 
|-id=694 bgcolor=#E9E9E9
| 343694 ||  || — || February 21, 2007 || Mount Lemmon || Mount Lemmon Survey || — || align=right | 1.4 km || 
|-id=695 bgcolor=#fefefe
| 343695 ||  || — || April 16, 2004 || Kitt Peak || Spacewatch || — || align=right data-sort-value="0.96" | 960 m || 
|-id=696 bgcolor=#fefefe
| 343696 ||  || — || February 22, 2004 || Kitt Peak || Spacewatch || FLO || align=right data-sort-value="0.64" | 640 m || 
|-id=697 bgcolor=#fefefe
| 343697 ||  || — || March 16, 2004 || Palomar || NEAT || — || align=right | 1.3 km || 
|-id=698 bgcolor=#fefefe
| 343698 ||  || — || February 23, 2007 || Mount Lemmon || Mount Lemmon Survey || MAS || align=right data-sort-value="0.80" | 800 m || 
|-id=699 bgcolor=#fefefe
| 343699 ||  || — || March 19, 2004 || Palomar || NEAT || FLO || align=right data-sort-value="0.89" | 890 m || 
|-id=700 bgcolor=#fefefe
| 343700 ||  || — || February 16, 2004 || Kitt Peak || Spacewatch || — || align=right data-sort-value="0.92" | 920 m || 
|}

343701–343800 

|-bgcolor=#fefefe
| 343701 ||  || — || July 30, 2008 || Mount Lemmon || Mount Lemmon Survey || NYS || align=right data-sort-value="0.76" | 760 m || 
|-id=702 bgcolor=#fefefe
| 343702 ||  || — || March 13, 2004 || Palomar || NEAT || — || align=right | 1.2 km || 
|-id=703 bgcolor=#E9E9E9
| 343703 ||  || — || September 6, 2008 || Mount Lemmon || Mount Lemmon Survey || JUL || align=right | 1.1 km || 
|-id=704 bgcolor=#E9E9E9
| 343704 ||  || — || December 13, 2010 || Mount Lemmon || Mount Lemmon Survey || — || align=right | 2.7 km || 
|-id=705 bgcolor=#fefefe
| 343705 ||  || — || January 13, 2008 || Catalina || CSS || H || align=right data-sort-value="0.66" | 660 m || 
|-id=706 bgcolor=#d6d6d6
| 343706 ||  || — || April 27, 2000 || Anderson Mesa || LONEOS || EUP || align=right | 4.0 km || 
|-id=707 bgcolor=#E9E9E9
| 343707 ||  || — || September 13, 1980 || Palomar || S. J. Bus || — || align=right | 2.2 km || 
|-id=708 bgcolor=#fefefe
| 343708 ||  || — || December 5, 2010 || Mount Lemmon || Mount Lemmon Survey || FLO || align=right data-sort-value="0.80" | 800 m || 
|-id=709 bgcolor=#fefefe
| 343709 ||  || — || March 17, 2004 || Kitt Peak || Spacewatch || — || align=right data-sort-value="0.92" | 920 m || 
|-id=710 bgcolor=#fefefe
| 343710 ||  || — || November 4, 2005 || Mount Lemmon || Mount Lemmon Survey || — || align=right | 1.1 km || 
|-id=711 bgcolor=#fefefe
| 343711 ||  || — || August 8, 2004 || Palomar || NEAT || — || align=right | 1.4 km || 
|-id=712 bgcolor=#fefefe
| 343712 ||  || — || October 5, 2002 || Apache Point || SDSS || FLO || align=right data-sort-value="0.56" | 560 m || 
|-id=713 bgcolor=#fefefe
| 343713 ||  || — || June 14, 2008 || Siding Spring || SSS || PHO || align=right | 1.6 km || 
|-id=714 bgcolor=#fefefe
| 343714 ||  || — || October 5, 2005 || Catalina || CSS || FLO || align=right data-sort-value="0.78" | 780 m || 
|-id=715 bgcolor=#E9E9E9
| 343715 ||  || — || April 11, 2007 || Kitt Peak || Spacewatch || — || align=right | 1.7 km || 
|-id=716 bgcolor=#E9E9E9
| 343716 ||  || — || April 19, 2007 || Mount Lemmon || Mount Lemmon Survey || — || align=right | 2.2 km || 
|-id=717 bgcolor=#fefefe
| 343717 ||  || — || August 31, 2005 || Palomar || NEAT || — || align=right data-sort-value="0.69" | 690 m || 
|-id=718 bgcolor=#fefefe
| 343718 ||  || — || January 27, 2007 || Mount Lemmon || Mount Lemmon Survey || NYS || align=right data-sort-value="0.71" | 710 m || 
|-id=719 bgcolor=#fefefe
| 343719 ||  || — || February 9, 2007 || Kitt Peak || Spacewatch || — || align=right | 1.2 km || 
|-id=720 bgcolor=#fefefe
| 343720 ||  || — || April 11, 1996 || Kitt Peak || Spacewatch || — || align=right | 1.0 km || 
|-id=721 bgcolor=#fefefe
| 343721 ||  || — || June 30, 2008 || Kitt Peak || Spacewatch || — || align=right data-sort-value="0.83" | 830 m || 
|-id=722 bgcolor=#fefefe
| 343722 ||  || — || May 28, 2000 || Socorro || LINEAR || — || align=right | 1.0 km || 
|-id=723 bgcolor=#fefefe
| 343723 ||  || — || March 15, 2004 || Socorro || LINEAR || — || align=right data-sort-value="0.83" | 830 m || 
|-id=724 bgcolor=#fefefe
| 343724 ||  || — || April 14, 2004 || Kitt Peak || Spacewatch || NYS || align=right data-sort-value="0.69" | 690 m || 
|-id=725 bgcolor=#fefefe
| 343725 ||  || — || February 21, 2007 || Kitt Peak || Spacewatch || V || align=right data-sort-value="0.96" | 960 m || 
|-id=726 bgcolor=#fefefe
| 343726 ||  || — || November 24, 2009 || Kitt Peak || Spacewatch || FLO || align=right data-sort-value="0.62" | 620 m || 
|-id=727 bgcolor=#fefefe
| 343727 ||  || — || November 2, 1999 || Kitt Peak || Spacewatch || H || align=right data-sort-value="0.68" | 680 m || 
|-id=728 bgcolor=#fefefe
| 343728 ||  || — || September 21, 2001 || Kitt Peak || Spacewatch || Hcritical || align=right data-sort-value="0.45" | 450 m || 
|-id=729 bgcolor=#fefefe
| 343729 ||  || — || September 8, 2004 || Palomar || NEAT || H || align=right data-sort-value="0.66" | 660 m || 
|-id=730 bgcolor=#fefefe
| 343730 ||  || — || April 12, 2004 || Kitt Peak || Spacewatch || V || align=right data-sort-value="0.68" | 680 m || 
|-id=731 bgcolor=#fefefe
| 343731 ||  || — || February 16, 2004 || Kitt Peak || Spacewatch || — || align=right data-sort-value="0.83" | 830 m || 
|-id=732 bgcolor=#fefefe
| 343732 ||  || — || August 29, 2005 || Kitt Peak || Spacewatch || FLO || align=right data-sort-value="0.87" | 870 m || 
|-id=733 bgcolor=#fefefe
| 343733 ||  || — || February 16, 2007 || Catalina || CSS || — || align=right | 1.3 km || 
|-id=734 bgcolor=#fefefe
| 343734 ||  || — || May 15, 2001 || Haleakala || NEAT || — || align=right data-sort-value="0.94" | 940 m || 
|-id=735 bgcolor=#fefefe
| 343735 ||  || — || March 10, 2007 || Kitt Peak || Spacewatch || — || align=right | 1.1 km || 
|-id=736 bgcolor=#E9E9E9
| 343736 ||  || — || March 14, 2007 || Mount Lemmon || Mount Lemmon Survey || — || align=right | 1.1 km || 
|-id=737 bgcolor=#fefefe
| 343737 ||  || — || October 5, 2002 || Apache Point || SDSS || — || align=right data-sort-value="0.74" | 740 m || 
|-id=738 bgcolor=#E9E9E9
| 343738 ||  || — || March 2, 2010 || WISE || WISE || — || align=right | 3.2 km || 
|-id=739 bgcolor=#E9E9E9
| 343739 ||  || — || April 30, 2003 || Kitt Peak || Spacewatch || — || align=right | 1.1 km || 
|-id=740 bgcolor=#fefefe
| 343740 ||  || — || March 10, 2007 || Kitt Peak || Spacewatch || V || align=right data-sort-value="0.83" | 830 m || 
|-id=741 bgcolor=#fefefe
| 343741 ||  || — || March 31, 2008 || Mount Lemmon || Mount Lemmon Survey || — || align=right data-sort-value="0.78" | 780 m || 
|-id=742 bgcolor=#fefefe
| 343742 ||  || — || March 27, 2010 || WISE || WISE || SVE || align=right | 3.3 km || 
|-id=743 bgcolor=#E9E9E9
| 343743 Kjurkchieva ||  ||  || September 5, 2008 || Kitt Peak || Spacewatch || — || align=right | 1.9 km || 
|-id=744 bgcolor=#fefefe
| 343744 ||  || — || October 20, 2001 || Socorro || LINEAR || MAS || align=right data-sort-value="0.83" | 830 m || 
|-id=745 bgcolor=#E9E9E9
| 343745 ||  || — || October 7, 2008 || Kitt Peak || Spacewatch || — || align=right | 2.3 km || 
|-id=746 bgcolor=#fefefe
| 343746 ||  || — || March 11, 2007 || Kitt Peak || Spacewatch || V || align=right data-sort-value="0.80" | 800 m || 
|-id=747 bgcolor=#E9E9E9
| 343747 ||  || — || February 26, 2007 || Mount Lemmon || Mount Lemmon Survey || — || align=right data-sort-value="0.90" | 900 m || 
|-id=748 bgcolor=#E9E9E9
| 343748 ||  || — || April 7, 2003 || Kitt Peak || Spacewatch || — || align=right | 1.3 km || 
|-id=749 bgcolor=#d6d6d6
| 343749 ||  || — || April 26, 2000 || Anderson Mesa || LONEOS || — || align=right | 3.0 km || 
|-id=750 bgcolor=#E9E9E9
| 343750 ||  || — || April 9, 2002 || Kitt Peak || Spacewatch || INO || align=right | 1.3 km || 
|-id=751 bgcolor=#fefefe
| 343751 ||  || — || November 9, 1996 || Kitt Peak || Spacewatch || — || align=right data-sort-value="0.90" | 900 m || 
|-id=752 bgcolor=#d6d6d6
| 343752 ||  || — || March 8, 2000 || Kitt Peak || Spacewatch || — || align=right | 2.4 km || 
|-id=753 bgcolor=#fefefe
| 343753 ||  || — || May 6, 2008 || Mount Lemmon || Mount Lemmon Survey || — || align=right data-sort-value="0.94" | 940 m || 
|-id=754 bgcolor=#fefefe
| 343754 ||  || — || October 12, 2009 || Mount Lemmon || Mount Lemmon Survey || — || align=right data-sort-value="0.93" | 930 m || 
|-id=755 bgcolor=#E9E9E9
| 343755 ||  || — || April 4, 2002 || Palomar || NEAT || — || align=right | 2.2 km || 
|-id=756 bgcolor=#E9E9E9
| 343756 ||  || — || May 22, 2007 || Tiki || S. F. Hönig, N. Teamo || MIS || align=right | 2.3 km || 
|-id=757 bgcolor=#fefefe
| 343757 ||  || — || October 25, 2005 || Mount Lemmon || Mount Lemmon Survey || MAS || align=right data-sort-value="0.79" | 790 m || 
|-id=758 bgcolor=#fefefe
| 343758 ||  || — || October 12, 2005 || Kitt Peak || Spacewatch || — || align=right data-sort-value="0.67" | 670 m || 
|-id=759 bgcolor=#fefefe
| 343759 ||  || — || February 23, 2007 || Kitt Peak || Spacewatch || — || align=right | 1.1 km || 
|-id=760 bgcolor=#fefefe
| 343760 ||  || — || March 15, 2001 || Kitt Peak || Spacewatch || — || align=right data-sort-value="0.74" | 740 m || 
|-id=761 bgcolor=#E9E9E9
| 343761 ||  || — || September 14, 1999 || Kitt Peak || Spacewatch || ADE || align=right | 2.5 km || 
|-id=762 bgcolor=#fefefe
| 343762 ||  || — || July 11, 2004 || Socorro || LINEAR || — || align=right | 1.1 km || 
|-id=763 bgcolor=#fefefe
| 343763 ||  || — || March 10, 2007 || Mount Lemmon || Mount Lemmon Survey || NYS || align=right data-sort-value="0.59" | 590 m || 
|-id=764 bgcolor=#fefefe
| 343764 ||  || — || November 13, 2006 || Kitt Peak || Spacewatch || — || align=right data-sort-value="0.81" | 810 m || 
|-id=765 bgcolor=#fefefe
| 343765 ||  || — || November 19, 2009 || Mount Lemmon || Mount Lemmon Survey || V || align=right data-sort-value="0.78" | 780 m || 
|-id=766 bgcolor=#fefefe
| 343766 ||  || — || August 31, 2005 || Kitt Peak || Spacewatch || V || align=right data-sort-value="0.65" | 650 m || 
|-id=767 bgcolor=#fefefe
| 343767 ||  || — || February 11, 2004 || Palomar || NEAT || FLO || align=right data-sort-value="0.66" | 660 m || 
|-id=768 bgcolor=#E9E9E9
| 343768 ||  || — || May 13, 2007 || XuYi || PMO NEO || ADE || align=right | 2.2 km || 
|-id=769 bgcolor=#fefefe
| 343769 ||  || — || July 28, 2008 || Mount Lemmon || Mount Lemmon Survey || — || align=right | 1.2 km || 
|-id=770 bgcolor=#fefefe
| 343770 ||  || — || November 22, 2009 || Kitt Peak || Spacewatch || — || align=right | 1.1 km || 
|-id=771 bgcolor=#fefefe
| 343771 ||  || — || October 5, 2005 || Mount Lemmon || Mount Lemmon Survey || — || align=right data-sort-value="0.76" | 760 m || 
|-id=772 bgcolor=#fefefe
| 343772 ||  || — || March 13, 2004 || Palomar || NEAT || — || align=right | 1.0 km || 
|-id=773 bgcolor=#fefefe
| 343773 ||  || — || September 16, 2009 || Kitt Peak || Spacewatch || V || align=right data-sort-value="0.87" | 870 m || 
|-id=774 bgcolor=#fefefe
| 343774 Samuelhale ||  ||  || October 20, 2006 || Kitt Peak || L. H. Wasserman || NYS || align=right data-sort-value="0.94" | 940 m || 
|-id=775 bgcolor=#E9E9E9
| 343775 ||  || — || January 9, 2006 || Mount Lemmon || Mount Lemmon Survey || — || align=right | 2.4 km || 
|-id=776 bgcolor=#fefefe
| 343776 ||  || — || August 23, 2001 || Palomar || NEAT || H || align=right data-sort-value="0.84" | 840 m || 
|-id=777 bgcolor=#fefefe
| 343777 ||  || — || March 12, 2007 || Kitt Peak || Spacewatch || NYS || align=right | 1.1 km || 
|-id=778 bgcolor=#fefefe
| 343778 ||  || — || August 29, 2005 || Palomar || NEAT || — || align=right | 1.1 km || 
|-id=779 bgcolor=#E9E9E9
| 343779 ||  || — || May 8, 2007 || Catalina || CSS || — || align=right | 1.9 km || 
|-id=780 bgcolor=#fefefe
| 343780 ||  || — || December 21, 2006 || Mount Lemmon || Mount Lemmon Survey || FLO || align=right data-sort-value="0.63" | 630 m || 
|-id=781 bgcolor=#fefefe
| 343781 ||  || — || March 18, 2004 || Socorro || LINEAR || — || align=right data-sort-value="0.91" | 910 m || 
|-id=782 bgcolor=#fefefe
| 343782 ||  || — || January 28, 2007 || Kitt Peak || Spacewatch || FLO || align=right data-sort-value="0.80" | 800 m || 
|-id=783 bgcolor=#fefefe
| 343783 ||  || — || November 18, 2006 || Mount Lemmon || Mount Lemmon Survey || — || align=right data-sort-value="0.80" | 800 m || 
|-id=784 bgcolor=#fefefe
| 343784 ||  || — || May 8, 1997 || Kitt Peak || Spacewatch || V || align=right data-sort-value="0.65" | 650 m || 
|-id=785 bgcolor=#fefefe
| 343785 ||  || — || October 26, 2009 || Kitt Peak || Spacewatch || — || align=right data-sort-value="0.99" | 990 m || 
|-id=786 bgcolor=#fefefe
| 343786 ||  || — || July 28, 2008 || Siding Spring || SSS || — || align=right | 1.1 km || 
|-id=787 bgcolor=#fefefe
| 343787 ||  || — || August 1, 2001 || Palomar || NEAT || H || align=right data-sort-value="0.83" | 830 m || 
|-id=788 bgcolor=#E9E9E9
| 343788 ||  || — || March 13, 2007 || Mount Lemmon || Mount Lemmon Survey || EUN || align=right | 1.1 km || 
|-id=789 bgcolor=#E9E9E9
| 343789 ||  || — || October 6, 2008 || Mount Lemmon || Mount Lemmon Survey || — || align=right | 1.6 km || 
|-id=790 bgcolor=#E9E9E9
| 343790 ||  || — || January 31, 2006 || Kitt Peak || Spacewatch || VIB || align=right | 1.9 km || 
|-id=791 bgcolor=#E9E9E9
| 343791 ||  || — || October 20, 2008 || Kitt Peak || Spacewatch || — || align=right | 1.3 km || 
|-id=792 bgcolor=#E9E9E9
| 343792 ||  || — || May 26, 2007 || Mount Lemmon || Mount Lemmon Survey || — || align=right | 1.7 km || 
|-id=793 bgcolor=#E9E9E9
| 343793 ||  || — || January 22, 2006 || Mount Lemmon || Mount Lemmon Survey || — || align=right | 1.6 km || 
|-id=794 bgcolor=#C2FFFF
| 343794 ||  || — || March 5, 2002 || Anderson Mesa || LONEOS || L4 || align=right | 12 km || 
|-id=795 bgcolor=#fefefe
| 343795 ||  || — || March 14, 2004 || Kitt Peak || Spacewatch || FLO || align=right data-sort-value="0.85" | 850 m || 
|-id=796 bgcolor=#fefefe
| 343796 ||  || — || August 30, 2005 || Kitt Peak || Spacewatch || — || align=right data-sort-value="0.78" | 780 m || 
|-id=797 bgcolor=#fefefe
| 343797 ||  || — || June 15, 2001 || Haleakala || NEAT || — || align=right data-sort-value="0.86" | 860 m || 
|-id=798 bgcolor=#fefefe
| 343798 ||  || — || August 10, 2004 || Socorro || LINEAR || V || align=right data-sort-value="0.90" | 900 m || 
|-id=799 bgcolor=#fefefe
| 343799 ||  || — || February 26, 2007 || Mount Lemmon || Mount Lemmon Survey || V || align=right data-sort-value="0.82" | 820 m || 
|-id=800 bgcolor=#d6d6d6
| 343800 ||  || — || September 9, 2001 || Anderson Mesa || LONEOS || — || align=right | 4.1 km || 
|}

343801–343900 

|-bgcolor=#fefefe
| 343801 ||  || — || March 1, 2011 || Mount Lemmon || Mount Lemmon Survey || — || align=right data-sort-value="0.86" | 860 m || 
|-id=802 bgcolor=#fefefe
| 343802 ||  || — || July 22, 2001 || Palomar || NEAT || — || align=right | 1.1 km || 
|-id=803 bgcolor=#fefefe
| 343803 ||  || — || October 19, 2001 || Palomar || NEAT || NYS || align=right data-sort-value="0.79" | 790 m || 
|-id=804 bgcolor=#E9E9E9
| 343804 ||  || — || January 23, 2006 || Catalina || CSS || ADE || align=right | 2.4 km || 
|-id=805 bgcolor=#fefefe
| 343805 ||  || — || March 29, 2000 || Kitt Peak || Spacewatch || MAS || align=right data-sort-value="0.86" | 860 m || 
|-id=806 bgcolor=#fefefe
| 343806 ||  || — || September 21, 1995 || Haleakala || NEAT || — || align=right | 1.0 km || 
|-id=807 bgcolor=#E9E9E9
| 343807 ||  || — || November 17, 1995 || Kitt Peak || Spacewatch || — || align=right | 2.7 km || 
|-id=808 bgcolor=#fefefe
| 343808 ||  || — || March 12, 2004 || Palomar || NEAT || — || align=right data-sort-value="0.92" | 920 m || 
|-id=809 bgcolor=#E9E9E9
| 343809 ||  || — || March 31, 2003 || Anderson Mesa || LONEOS || — || align=right | 4.0 km || 
|-id=810 bgcolor=#E9E9E9
| 343810 ||  || — || November 5, 2004 || Anderson Mesa || LONEOS || — || align=right | 2.4 km || 
|-id=811 bgcolor=#fefefe
| 343811 ||  || — || April 5, 2000 || Anderson Mesa || LONEOS || NYS || align=right data-sort-value="0.74" | 740 m || 
|-id=812 bgcolor=#fefefe
| 343812 ||  || — || February 10, 2007 || Mount Lemmon || Mount Lemmon Survey || — || align=right data-sort-value="0.73" | 730 m || 
|-id=813 bgcolor=#E9E9E9
| 343813 ||  || — || April 6, 2010 || WISE || WISE || JUN || align=right | 1.6 km || 
|-id=814 bgcolor=#E9E9E9
| 343814 ||  || — || September 4, 1999 || Kitt Peak || Spacewatch || — || align=right | 1.7 km || 
|-id=815 bgcolor=#fefefe
| 343815 ||  || — || September 29, 2005 || Kitt Peak || Spacewatch || FLO || align=right data-sort-value="0.84" | 840 m || 
|-id=816 bgcolor=#d6d6d6
| 343816 ||  || — || August 15, 2001 || Haleakala || NEAT || — || align=right | 2.6 km || 
|-id=817 bgcolor=#fefefe
| 343817 ||  || — || March 16, 2007 || Kitt Peak || Spacewatch || NYS || align=right data-sort-value="0.67" | 670 m || 
|-id=818 bgcolor=#E9E9E9
| 343818 ||  || — || April 17, 1998 || Kitt Peak || Spacewatch || EUN || align=right | 1.3 km || 
|-id=819 bgcolor=#E9E9E9
| 343819 ||  || — || December 17, 2009 || Mount Lemmon || Mount Lemmon Survey || — || align=right | 1.3 km || 
|-id=820 bgcolor=#fefefe
| 343820 ||  || — || October 1, 2002 || Socorro || LINEAR || FLO || align=right data-sort-value="0.86" | 860 m || 
|-id=821 bgcolor=#fefefe
| 343821 ||  || — || March 12, 2007 || Kitt Peak || Spacewatch || V || align=right data-sort-value="0.99" | 990 m || 
|-id=822 bgcolor=#E9E9E9
| 343822 ||  || — || April 7, 2006 || Mount Lemmon || Mount Lemmon Survey || MRX || align=right | 1.1 km || 
|-id=823 bgcolor=#E9E9E9
| 343823 ||  || — || January 6, 2010 || Kitt Peak || Spacewatch || MAR || align=right | 1.2 km || 
|-id=824 bgcolor=#fefefe
| 343824 ||  || — || September 13, 2005 || Kitt Peak || Spacewatch || FLO || align=right data-sort-value="0.67" | 670 m || 
|-id=825 bgcolor=#E9E9E9
| 343825 ||  || — || November 18, 2003 || Kitt Peak || Spacewatch || — || align=right | 3.0 km || 
|-id=826 bgcolor=#E9E9E9
| 343826 ||  || — || October 19, 2003 || Kitt Peak || Spacewatch || — || align=right | 2.2 km || 
|-id=827 bgcolor=#E9E9E9
| 343827 ||  || — || September 11, 1991 || Palomar || H. E. Holt || — || align=right | 1.3 km || 
|-id=828 bgcolor=#E9E9E9
| 343828 ||  || — || November 1, 2008 || Mount Lemmon || Mount Lemmon Survey || MIS || align=right | 2.8 km || 
|-id=829 bgcolor=#fefefe
| 343829 ||  || — || March 17, 2004 || Kitt Peak || Spacewatch || — || align=right data-sort-value="0.89" | 890 m || 
|-id=830 bgcolor=#d6d6d6
| 343830 ||  || — || February 15, 2010 || Mount Lemmon || Mount Lemmon Survey || — || align=right | 3.9 km || 
|-id=831 bgcolor=#fefefe
| 343831 ||  || — || February 13, 2004 || Kitt Peak || Spacewatch || — || align=right data-sort-value="0.98" | 980 m || 
|-id=832 bgcolor=#d6d6d6
| 343832 ||  || — || August 12, 2006 || Palomar || NEAT || EUP || align=right | 3.9 km || 
|-id=833 bgcolor=#fefefe
| 343833 ||  || — || November 6, 2005 || Kitt Peak || Spacewatch || NYS || align=right data-sort-value="0.84" | 840 m || 
|-id=834 bgcolor=#d6d6d6
| 343834 ||  || — || September 14, 2007 || Catalina || CSS || — || align=right | 4.1 km || 
|-id=835 bgcolor=#fefefe
| 343835 ||  || — || August 7, 2008 || Kitt Peak || Spacewatch || V || align=right data-sort-value="0.94" | 940 m || 
|-id=836 bgcolor=#fefefe
| 343836 ||  || — || December 1, 2005 || Mount Lemmon || Mount Lemmon Survey || V || align=right data-sort-value="0.75" | 750 m || 
|-id=837 bgcolor=#fefefe
| 343837 ||  || — || March 29, 2000 || Kitt Peak || Spacewatch || — || align=right data-sort-value="0.77" | 770 m || 
|-id=838 bgcolor=#d6d6d6
| 343838 ||  || — || April 1, 2005 || Kitt Peak || Spacewatch || — || align=right | 3.3 km || 
|-id=839 bgcolor=#E9E9E9
| 343839 ||  || — || November 7, 2008 || Mount Lemmon || Mount Lemmon Survey || — || align=right | 2.2 km || 
|-id=840 bgcolor=#E9E9E9
| 343840 ||  || — || December 15, 2004 || Kitt Peak || Spacewatch || EUN || align=right | 1.5 km || 
|-id=841 bgcolor=#E9E9E9
| 343841 ||  || — || February 25, 2006 || Mount Lemmon || Mount Lemmon Survey || — || align=right | 1.4 km || 
|-id=842 bgcolor=#E9E9E9
| 343842 ||  || — || August 31, 1995 || La Silla || C.-I. Lagerkvist || — || align=right | 2.2 km || 
|-id=843 bgcolor=#E9E9E9
| 343843 ||  || — || September 24, 2008 || Mount Lemmon || Mount Lemmon Survey || — || align=right data-sort-value="0.98" | 980 m || 
|-id=844 bgcolor=#E9E9E9
| 343844 ||  || — || July 10, 2007 || Siding Spring || SSS || — || align=right | 2.9 km || 
|-id=845 bgcolor=#fefefe
| 343845 ||  || — || February 21, 2007 || Kitt Peak || Spacewatch || NYScritical || align=right data-sort-value="0.60" | 600 m || 
|-id=846 bgcolor=#fefefe
| 343846 ||  || — || March 7, 2003 || Kitt Peak || Spacewatch || LCI || align=right | 1.2 km || 
|-id=847 bgcolor=#E9E9E9
| 343847 ||  || — || December 25, 2005 || Mount Lemmon || Mount Lemmon Survey || — || align=right | 1.3 km || 
|-id=848 bgcolor=#E9E9E9
| 343848 ||  || — || December 14, 2004 || Socorro || LINEAR || — || align=right | 2.7 km || 
|-id=849 bgcolor=#E9E9E9
| 343849 ||  || — || April 9, 2006 || Kitt Peak || Spacewatch || GAL || align=right | 1.8 km || 
|-id=850 bgcolor=#d6d6d6
| 343850 ||  || — || July 18, 2006 || Siding Spring || SSS || TIR || align=right | 3.7 km || 
|-id=851 bgcolor=#fefefe
| 343851 ||  || — || February 26, 2007 || Mount Lemmon || Mount Lemmon Survey || — || align=right data-sort-value="0.81" | 810 m || 
|-id=852 bgcolor=#E9E9E9
| 343852 ||  || — || April 25, 2007 || Kitt Peak || Spacewatch || — || align=right data-sort-value="0.87" | 870 m || 
|-id=853 bgcolor=#E9E9E9
| 343853 ||  || — || April 9, 2003 || Kitt Peak || Spacewatch || EUN || align=right | 1.2 km || 
|-id=854 bgcolor=#fefefe
| 343854 ||  || — || November 6, 2005 || Mount Lemmon || Mount Lemmon Survey || V || align=right data-sort-value="0.72" | 720 m || 
|-id=855 bgcolor=#E9E9E9
| 343855 ||  || — || July 4, 2003 || Kitt Peak || Spacewatch || — || align=right | 1.7 km || 
|-id=856 bgcolor=#fefefe
| 343856 ||  || — || April 20, 2004 || Kitt Peak || Spacewatch || — || align=right data-sort-value="0.90" | 900 m || 
|-id=857 bgcolor=#E9E9E9
| 343857 ||  || — || March 20, 2002 || Kitt Peak || Spacewatch || EUN || align=right | 1.6 km || 
|-id=858 bgcolor=#E9E9E9
| 343858 ||  || — || October 27, 2008 || Mount Lemmon || Mount Lemmon Survey || — || align=right | 2.5 km || 
|-id=859 bgcolor=#d6d6d6
| 343859 ||  || — || October 8, 2001 || Palomar || NEAT || — || align=right | 4.4 km || 
|-id=860 bgcolor=#fefefe
| 343860 ||  || — || February 23, 2007 || Kitt Peak || Spacewatch || — || align=right data-sort-value="0.99" | 990 m || 
|-id=861 bgcolor=#E9E9E9
| 343861 ||  || — || August 24, 2008 || Kitt Peak || Spacewatch || MAR || align=right | 1.2 km || 
|-id=862 bgcolor=#fefefe
| 343862 ||  || — || October 7, 2005 || Catalina || CSS || FLO || align=right data-sort-value="0.86" | 860 m || 
|-id=863 bgcolor=#fefefe
| 343863 ||  || — || June 11, 2004 || Kitt Peak || Spacewatch || — || align=right data-sort-value="0.96" | 960 m || 
|-id=864 bgcolor=#fefefe
| 343864 ||  || — || January 27, 2007 || Mount Lemmon || Mount Lemmon Survey || MAS || align=right data-sort-value="0.87" | 870 m || 
|-id=865 bgcolor=#d6d6d6
| 343865 ||  || — || September 14, 2007 || Catalina || CSS || ALA || align=right | 4.6 km || 
|-id=866 bgcolor=#E9E9E9
| 343866 ||  || — || April 24, 2003 || Kitt Peak || Spacewatch || — || align=right | 1.1 km || 
|-id=867 bgcolor=#E9E9E9
| 343867 ||  || — || February 25, 2006 || Kitt Peak || Spacewatch || — || align=right | 2.0 km || 
|-id=868 bgcolor=#d6d6d6
| 343868 ||  || — || May 20, 2010 || WISE || WISE || — || align=right | 4.8 km || 
|-id=869 bgcolor=#fefefe
| 343869 ||  || — || March 23, 2001 || Anderson Mesa || LONEOS || FLO || align=right data-sort-value="0.62" | 620 m || 
|-id=870 bgcolor=#E9E9E9
| 343870 ||  || — || February 27, 2006 || Kitt Peak || Spacewatch || — || align=right | 1.9 km || 
|-id=871 bgcolor=#E9E9E9
| 343871 ||  || — || February 25, 2006 || Kitt Peak || Spacewatch || — || align=right | 1.6 km || 
|-id=872 bgcolor=#E9E9E9
| 343872 ||  || — || January 26, 2006 || Kitt Peak || Spacewatch || — || align=right | 2.2 km || 
|-id=873 bgcolor=#E9E9E9
| 343873 ||  || — || July 15, 2007 || La Sagra || OAM Obs. || DOR || align=right | 2.2 km || 
|-id=874 bgcolor=#E9E9E9
| 343874 ||  || — || September 17, 2003 || Kitt Peak || Spacewatch || — || align=right | 2.3 km || 
|-id=875 bgcolor=#fefefe
| 343875 ||  || — || September 26, 2005 || Kitt Peak || Spacewatch || — || align=right data-sort-value="0.78" | 780 m || 
|-id=876 bgcolor=#E9E9E9
| 343876 ||  || — || October 7, 2008 || Mount Lemmon || Mount Lemmon Survey || — || align=right | 2.1 km || 
|-id=877 bgcolor=#fefefe
| 343877 ||  || — || April 1, 2004 || Kitt Peak || Spacewatch || FLO || align=right data-sort-value="0.68" | 680 m || 
|-id=878 bgcolor=#fefefe
| 343878 ||  || — || February 16, 2004 || Socorro || LINEAR || — || align=right | 1.0 km || 
|-id=879 bgcolor=#fefefe
| 343879 ||  || — || September 3, 2000 || Kitt Peak || Spacewatch || — || align=right | 1.2 km || 
|-id=880 bgcolor=#fefefe
| 343880 ||  || — || July 8, 2004 || Siding Spring || SSS || MAS || align=right data-sort-value="0.78" | 780 m || 
|-id=881 bgcolor=#fefefe
| 343881 ||  || — || June 11, 2004 || Kitt Peak || Spacewatch || — || align=right data-sort-value="0.83" | 830 m || 
|-id=882 bgcolor=#fefefe
| 343882 ||  || — || October 14, 1998 || Kitt Peak || Spacewatch || NYS || align=right data-sort-value="0.75" | 750 m || 
|-id=883 bgcolor=#fefefe
| 343883 ||  || — || February 13, 2007 || Mount Lemmon || Mount Lemmon Survey || NYS || align=right data-sort-value="0.62" | 620 m || 
|-id=884 bgcolor=#E9E9E9
| 343884 ||  || — || September 2, 2008 || Kitt Peak || Spacewatch || — || align=right | 1.00 km || 
|-id=885 bgcolor=#E9E9E9
| 343885 ||  || — || September 24, 2008 || Kitt Peak || Spacewatch || — || align=right | 1.7 km || 
|-id=886 bgcolor=#fefefe
| 343886 ||  || — || May 4, 2000 || Apache Point || SDSS || FLO || align=right data-sort-value="0.75" | 750 m || 
|-id=887 bgcolor=#fefefe
| 343887 ||  || — || January 7, 2010 || Mount Lemmon || Mount Lemmon Survey || V || align=right data-sort-value="0.79" | 790 m || 
|-id=888 bgcolor=#fefefe
| 343888 ||  || — || February 6, 2007 || Kitt Peak || Spacewatch || V || align=right data-sort-value="0.70" | 700 m || 
|-id=889 bgcolor=#E9E9E9
| 343889 ||  || — || December 18, 2009 || Mount Lemmon || Mount Lemmon Survey || — || align=right | 1.3 km || 
|-id=890 bgcolor=#E9E9E9
| 343890 ||  || — || December 19, 2004 || Mount Lemmon || Mount Lemmon Survey || — || align=right | 2.4 km || 
|-id=891 bgcolor=#E9E9E9
| 343891 ||  || — || October 19, 2003 || Apache Point || SDSS || GEF || align=right | 1.1 km || 
|-id=892 bgcolor=#fefefe
| 343892 ||  || — || July 31, 2005 || Palomar || NEAT || V || align=right data-sort-value="0.75" | 750 m || 
|-id=893 bgcolor=#E9E9E9
| 343893 ||  || — || September 19, 2008 || Kitt Peak || Spacewatch || — || align=right | 2.4 km || 
|-id=894 bgcolor=#E9E9E9
| 343894 ||  || — || March 1, 2011 || Mount Lemmon || Mount Lemmon Survey || BRG || align=right | 2.0 km || 
|-id=895 bgcolor=#fefefe
| 343895 ||  || — || January 27, 2007 || Mount Lemmon || Mount Lemmon Survey || — || align=right | 1.2 km || 
|-id=896 bgcolor=#C2FFFF
| 343896 ||  || — || May 6, 2011 || Mount Lemmon || Mount Lemmon Survey || L5 || align=right | 10 km || 
|-id=897 bgcolor=#d6d6d6
| 343897 ||  || — || May 7, 2006 || Kitt Peak || Spacewatch || EOS || align=right | 2.1 km || 
|-id=898 bgcolor=#E9E9E9
| 343898 ||  || — || December 24, 2005 || Kitt Peak || Spacewatch || — || align=right | 1.2 km || 
|-id=899 bgcolor=#d6d6d6
| 343899 ||  || — || October 25, 2008 || Kitt Peak || Spacewatch || — || align=right | 4.3 km || 
|-id=900 bgcolor=#E9E9E9
| 343900 ||  || — || October 14, 2003 || Anderson Mesa || LONEOS || — || align=right | 3.8 km || 
|}

343901–344000 

|-bgcolor=#E9E9E9
| 343901 ||  || — || October 29, 2003 || Kitt Peak || Spacewatch || DOR || align=right | 3.4 km || 
|-id=902 bgcolor=#fefefe
| 343902 ||  || — || November 10, 2009 || Kitt Peak || Spacewatch || — || align=right | 1.1 km || 
|-id=903 bgcolor=#E9E9E9
| 343903 ||  || — || November 27, 2000 || Socorro || LINEAR || BAR || align=right | 2.2 km || 
|-id=904 bgcolor=#E9E9E9
| 343904 ||  || — || February 13, 2002 || Apache Point || SDSS || — || align=right | 1.6 km || 
|-id=905 bgcolor=#d6d6d6
| 343905 ||  || — || July 18, 2006 || Siding Spring || SSS || — || align=right | 4.1 km || 
|-id=906 bgcolor=#E9E9E9
| 343906 ||  || — || May 9, 2007 || Kitt Peak || Spacewatch || — || align=right | 1.2 km || 
|-id=907 bgcolor=#E9E9E9
| 343907 ||  || — || August 25, 1995 || Kitt Peak || Spacewatch || BRG || align=right | 1.7 km || 
|-id=908 bgcolor=#E9E9E9
| 343908 ||  || — || May 1, 2003 || Kitt Peak || Spacewatch || — || align=right data-sort-value="0.97" | 970 m || 
|-id=909 bgcolor=#E9E9E9
| 343909 ||  || — || July 24, 2003 || Palomar || NEAT || — || align=right | 1.4 km || 
|-id=910 bgcolor=#E9E9E9
| 343910 ||  || — || September 23, 2008 || Mount Lemmon || Mount Lemmon Survey || MAR || align=right data-sort-value="0.97" | 970 m || 
|-id=911 bgcolor=#E9E9E9
| 343911 ||  || — || May 11, 2007 || Mount Lemmon || Mount Lemmon Survey || — || align=right data-sort-value="0.87" | 870 m || 
|-id=912 bgcolor=#fefefe
| 343912 ||  || — || October 25, 2005 || Kitt Peak || Spacewatch || — || align=right | 1.1 km || 
|-id=913 bgcolor=#E9E9E9
| 343913 ||  || — || October 5, 2003 || Kitt Peak || Spacewatch || GEF || align=right | 1.8 km || 
|-id=914 bgcolor=#E9E9E9
| 343914 ||  || — || February 6, 2002 || Socorro || LINEAR || — || align=right | 1.4 km || 
|-id=915 bgcolor=#E9E9E9
| 343915 ||  || — || February 25, 2006 || Mount Lemmon || Mount Lemmon Survey || — || align=right | 2.2 km || 
|-id=916 bgcolor=#E9E9E9
| 343916 ||  || — || May 22, 2007 || Tiki || S. F. Hönig, N. Teamo || — || align=right | 1.7 km || 
|-id=917 bgcolor=#E9E9E9
| 343917 ||  || — || October 20, 2008 || Kitt Peak || Spacewatch || — || align=right | 1.5 km || 
|-id=918 bgcolor=#d6d6d6
| 343918 ||  || — || August 29, 2006 || Anderson Mesa || LONEOS || — || align=right | 3.7 km || 
|-id=919 bgcolor=#fefefe
| 343919 ||  || — || January 27, 2003 || Palomar || NEAT || — || align=right | 1.2 km || 
|-id=920 bgcolor=#E9E9E9
| 343920 ||  || — || January 31, 2006 || Kitt Peak || Spacewatch || — || align=right | 1.2 km || 
|-id=921 bgcolor=#fefefe
| 343921 ||  || — || November 1, 2002 || La Palma || A. Fitzsimmons || — || align=right data-sort-value="0.77" | 770 m || 
|-id=922 bgcolor=#E9E9E9
| 343922 ||  || — || October 24, 2008 || Catalina || CSS || KON || align=right | 3.2 km || 
|-id=923 bgcolor=#fefefe
| 343923 ||  || — || August 29, 2005 || Palomar || NEAT || — || align=right | 1.1 km || 
|-id=924 bgcolor=#d6d6d6
| 343924 ||  || — || September 13, 2007 || Mount Lemmon || Mount Lemmon Survey || — || align=right | 2.5 km || 
|-id=925 bgcolor=#fefefe
| 343925 ||  || — || March 14, 2007 || Mount Lemmon || Mount Lemmon Survey || — || align=right data-sort-value="0.92" | 920 m || 
|-id=926 bgcolor=#d6d6d6
| 343926 ||  || — || March 11, 2005 || Kitt Peak || Spacewatch || — || align=right | 3.4 km || 
|-id=927 bgcolor=#fefefe
| 343927 ||  || — || March 19, 1993 || La Silla || UESAC || — || align=right data-sort-value="0.82" | 820 m || 
|-id=928 bgcolor=#E9E9E9
| 343928 ||  || — || December 9, 2004 || Kitt Peak || Spacewatch || — || align=right | 2.0 km || 
|-id=929 bgcolor=#d6d6d6
| 343929 ||  || — || January 2, 2009 || Mount Lemmon || Mount Lemmon Survey || — || align=right | 3.8 km || 
|-id=930 bgcolor=#d6d6d6
| 343930 ||  || — || October 21, 2001 || Kitt Peak || Spacewatch || — || align=right | 3.4 km || 
|-id=931 bgcolor=#E9E9E9
| 343931 ||  || — || October 9, 2008 || Kitt Peak || Spacewatch || — || align=right | 1.0 km || 
|-id=932 bgcolor=#d6d6d6
| 343932 ||  || — || May 4, 2000 || Apache Point || SDSS || — || align=right | 4.4 km || 
|-id=933 bgcolor=#E9E9E9
| 343933 ||  || — || July 3, 2003 || Kitt Peak || Spacewatch || — || align=right | 1.6 km || 
|-id=934 bgcolor=#fefefe
| 343934 ||  || — || November 6, 2005 || Kitt Peak || Spacewatch || — || align=right | 1.0 km || 
|-id=935 bgcolor=#fefefe
| 343935 ||  || — || April 30, 2000 || Haleakala || NEAT || — || align=right | 1.6 km || 
|-id=936 bgcolor=#E9E9E9
| 343936 ||  || — || November 25, 2005 || Kitt Peak || Spacewatch || — || align=right | 1.1 km || 
|-id=937 bgcolor=#fefefe
| 343937 ||  || — || September 24, 2005 || Anderson Mesa || LONEOS || V || align=right data-sort-value="0.89" | 890 m || 
|-id=938 bgcolor=#E9E9E9
| 343938 ||  || — || January 5, 2006 || Catalina || CSS || RAF || align=right | 1.6 km || 
|-id=939 bgcolor=#fefefe
| 343939 ||  || — || April 15, 2007 || Kitt Peak || Spacewatch || — || align=right | 1.0 km || 
|-id=940 bgcolor=#E9E9E9
| 343940 ||  || — || October 27, 2008 || Kitt Peak || Spacewatch || — || align=right | 1.9 km || 
|-id=941 bgcolor=#fefefe
| 343941 ||  || — || March 20, 2004 || Socorro || LINEAR || FLO || align=right data-sort-value="0.75" | 750 m || 
|-id=942 bgcolor=#E9E9E9
| 343942 ||  || — || December 25, 2005 || Mount Lemmon || Mount Lemmon Survey || — || align=right | 1.2 km || 
|-id=943 bgcolor=#fefefe
| 343943 ||  || — || April 11, 2007 || Siding Spring || SSS || — || align=right | 1.4 km || 
|-id=944 bgcolor=#E9E9E9
| 343944 ||  || — || February 9, 2010 || Mount Lemmon || Mount Lemmon Survey || ADE || align=right | 3.2 km || 
|-id=945 bgcolor=#d6d6d6
| 343945 ||  || — || September 10, 2007 || Kitt Peak || Spacewatch || KOR || align=right | 1.9 km || 
|-id=946 bgcolor=#fefefe
| 343946 ||  || — || April 13, 2004 || Kitt Peak || Spacewatch || FLO || align=right data-sort-value="0.83" | 830 m || 
|-id=947 bgcolor=#E9E9E9
| 343947 ||  || — || October 25, 2008 || Socorro || LINEAR || — || align=right | 2.5 km || 
|-id=948 bgcolor=#d6d6d6
| 343948 ||  || — || April 18, 2005 || Kitt Peak || Spacewatch || — || align=right | 2.6 km || 
|-id=949 bgcolor=#E9E9E9
| 343949 ||  || — || May 6, 2010 || WISE || WISE || DOR || align=right | 4.4 km || 
|-id=950 bgcolor=#fefefe
| 343950 ||  || — || November 9, 2009 || Kitt Peak || Spacewatch || — || align=right data-sort-value="0.96" | 960 m || 
|-id=951 bgcolor=#E9E9E9
| 343951 ||  || — || October 22, 2003 || Apache Point || SDSS || — || align=right | 3.7 km || 
|-id=952 bgcolor=#E9E9E9
| 343952 ||  || — || September 28, 2003 || Kitt Peak || Spacewatch || — || align=right | 2.3 km || 
|-id=953 bgcolor=#fefefe
| 343953 ||  || — || August 13, 2004 || Palomar || NEAT || — || align=right | 1.1 km || 
|-id=954 bgcolor=#d6d6d6
| 343954 ||  || — || September 10, 2007 || Kitt Peak || Spacewatch || — || align=right | 2.8 km || 
|-id=955 bgcolor=#E9E9E9
| 343955 ||  || — || December 10, 2004 || Kitt Peak || Spacewatch || — || align=right | 1.6 km || 
|-id=956 bgcolor=#d6d6d6
| 343956 ||  || — || October 10, 2007 || Catalina || CSS || — || align=right | 3.6 km || 
|-id=957 bgcolor=#E9E9E9
| 343957 ||  || — || April 12, 2002 || Palomar || NEAT || — || align=right | 2.3 km || 
|-id=958 bgcolor=#E9E9E9
| 343958 ||  || — || October 3, 2003 || Kitt Peak || Spacewatch || — || align=right | 2.9 km || 
|-id=959 bgcolor=#E9E9E9
| 343959 ||  || — || August 5, 2003 || Kitt Peak || Spacewatch || — || align=right | 1.5 km || 
|-id=960 bgcolor=#E9E9E9
| 343960 ||  || — || November 4, 1999 || Kitt Peak || Spacewatch || EUN || align=right | 1.1 km || 
|-id=961 bgcolor=#E9E9E9
| 343961 ||  || — || February 25, 2006 || Mount Lemmon || Mount Lemmon Survey || — || align=right | 1.8 km || 
|-id=962 bgcolor=#E9E9E9
| 343962 ||  || — || March 23, 2006 || Kitt Peak || Spacewatch || — || align=right | 1.9 km || 
|-id=963 bgcolor=#d6d6d6
| 343963 ||  || — || November 7, 2008 || Mount Lemmon || Mount Lemmon Survey || — || align=right | 3.0 km || 
|-id=964 bgcolor=#E9E9E9
| 343964 ||  || — || September 22, 2008 || Kitt Peak || Spacewatch || — || align=right | 1.6 km || 
|-id=965 bgcolor=#fefefe
| 343965 ||  || — || September 29, 2005 || Mount Lemmon || Mount Lemmon Survey || V || align=right data-sort-value="0.58" | 580 m || 
|-id=966 bgcolor=#E9E9E9
| 343966 ||  || — || April 23, 1998 || Socorro || LINEAR || — || align=right | 2.6 km || 
|-id=967 bgcolor=#E9E9E9
| 343967 ||  || — || September 16, 2003 || Kitt Peak || Spacewatch || WIT || align=right data-sort-value="0.97" | 970 m || 
|-id=968 bgcolor=#d6d6d6
| 343968 ||  || — || September 11, 2006 || Catalina || CSS || TIR || align=right | 3.3 km || 
|-id=969 bgcolor=#E9E9E9
| 343969 ||  || — || February 27, 2006 || Kitt Peak || Spacewatch || — || align=right | 1.7 km || 
|-id=970 bgcolor=#E9E9E9
| 343970 ||  || — || September 29, 2003 || Kitt Peak || Spacewatch || AGN || align=right | 1.2 km || 
|-id=971 bgcolor=#E9E9E9
| 343971 ||  || — || October 22, 2003 || Palomar || NEAT || — || align=right | 2.8 km || 
|-id=972 bgcolor=#d6d6d6
| 343972 ||  || — || April 7, 2005 || Kitt Peak || Spacewatch || — || align=right | 3.3 km || 
|-id=973 bgcolor=#fefefe
| 343973 ||  || — || March 13, 2007 || Mount Lemmon || Mount Lemmon Survey || — || align=right | 1.0 km || 
|-id=974 bgcolor=#E9E9E9
| 343974 ||  || — || November 8, 2008 || Kitt Peak || Spacewatch || — || align=right | 1.5 km || 
|-id=975 bgcolor=#C2FFFF
| 343975 ||  || — || May 2, 2010 || WISE || WISE || L5 || align=right | 11 km || 
|-id=976 bgcolor=#C2FFFF
| 343976 ||  || — || January 30, 2006 || Kitt Peak || Spacewatch || L5 || align=right | 10 km || 
|-id=977 bgcolor=#C2FFFF
| 343977 ||  || — || December 22, 2003 || Kitt Peak || Spacewatch || L5 || align=right | 9.6 km || 
|-id=978 bgcolor=#fefefe
| 343978 ||  || — || October 3, 1999 || Kitt Peak || Spacewatch || — || align=right data-sort-value="0.71" | 710 m || 
|-id=979 bgcolor=#d6d6d6
| 343979 ||  || — || August 16, 2006 || Palomar || NEAT || — || align=right | 5.0 km || 
|-id=980 bgcolor=#E9E9E9
| 343980 ||  || — || January 7, 2006 || Kitt Peak || Spacewatch || INO || align=right | 1.4 km || 
|-id=981 bgcolor=#d6d6d6
| 343981 ||  || — || March 7, 2010 || Taunus || S. Karge, E. Schwab || — || align=right | 3.2 km || 
|-id=982 bgcolor=#E9E9E9
| 343982 ||  || — || November 7, 2008 || Mount Lemmon || Mount Lemmon Survey || — || align=right | 2.4 km || 
|-id=983 bgcolor=#d6d6d6
| 343983 ||  || — || March 12, 2010 || Kitt Peak || Spacewatch || EOS || align=right | 2.0 km || 
|-id=984 bgcolor=#d6d6d6
| 343984 ||  || — || December 31, 2008 || Kitt Peak || Spacewatch || — || align=right | 3.5 km || 
|-id=985 bgcolor=#fefefe
| 343985 ||  || — || September 26, 2008 || Kitt Peak || Spacewatch || SUL || align=right | 2.3 km || 
|-id=986 bgcolor=#d6d6d6
| 343986 ||  || — || November 18, 2007 || Kitt Peak || Spacewatch || EOS || align=right | 1.8 km || 
|-id=987 bgcolor=#d6d6d6
| 343987 ||  || — || September 16, 2006 || Catalina || CSS || — || align=right | 4.8 km || 
|-id=988 bgcolor=#E9E9E9
| 343988 ||  || — || March 18, 2010 || Siding Spring || SSS || MAR || align=right | 1.5 km || 
|-id=989 bgcolor=#d6d6d6
| 343989 ||  || — || October 19, 2006 || Catalina || CSS || — || align=right | 3.8 km || 
|-id=990 bgcolor=#fefefe
| 343990 ||  || — || August 25, 2004 || Kitt Peak || Spacewatch || — || align=right data-sort-value="0.91" | 910 m || 
|-id=991 bgcolor=#d6d6d6
| 343991 ||  || — || August 13, 2006 || Palomar || NEAT || — || align=right | 3.5 km || 
|-id=992 bgcolor=#d6d6d6
| 343992 ||  || — || September 16, 2006 || Catalina || CSS || — || align=right | 4.5 km || 
|-id=993 bgcolor=#C2FFFF
| 343993 ||  || — || April 22, 2010 || WISE || WISE || L5 || align=right | 12 km || 
|-id=994 bgcolor=#C2FFFF
| 343994 ||  || — || September 24, 2000 || Socorro || LINEAR || L5 || align=right | 12 km || 
|-id=995 bgcolor=#C2FFFF
| 343995 ||  || — || March 30, 2008 || Kitt Peak || Spacewatch || L5 || align=right | 8.5 km || 
|-id=996 bgcolor=#C2FFFF
| 343996 ||  || — || July 2, 2011 || Kitt Peak || Spacewatch || L5 || align=right | 12 km || 
|-id=997 bgcolor=#d6d6d6
| 343997 ||  || — || November 7, 2007 || Kitt Peak || Spacewatch || — || align=right | 3.2 km || 
|-id=998 bgcolor=#d6d6d6
| 343998 ||  || — || November 19, 2001 || Socorro || LINEAR || — || align=right | 3.9 km || 
|-id=999 bgcolor=#C2FFFF
| 343999 ||  || — || March 2, 2006 || Kitt Peak || Spacewatch || L5 || align=right | 9.6 km || 
|-id=000 bgcolor=#fefefe
| 344000 Astropolis ||  ||  || October 7, 2004 || Kitt Peak || Spacewatch || V || align=right data-sort-value="0.99" | 990 m || 
|}

References

External links 
 Discovery Circumstances: Numbered Minor Planets (340001)–(345000) (IAU Minor Planet Center)

0343